= Glossary of quantum philosophy =

This is a glossary for the terminology applied in the foundations of quantum mechanics and quantum metaphysics, collectively called quantum philosophy, a subfield of philosophy of physics.

Note that this is a highly debated field, hence different researchers may have different definitions on the terms.

== Physics ==
=== Non-classical properties of quantum mechanics ===
nonseparability

See also: entangled

Nonlocality
Superposition of states
See also: Schrödinger's cat

=== Quantum phenomena ===
decoherence
uncertainty principle
See also: Einstein and the quantum
entanglement
See also: Bell's theorem, EPR paradox and CHSH inequality
quantum teleportation
superselection rule
quantum erasure
delayed choice experiment
Quantum Zeno effect
premeasurement
ideal measurement

=== Suggested physical entities ===
hidden variables
ensemble

=== Terms used in the formalism of quantum mechanics ===
Born's rule
collapse postulate
measurement
relative state
decoherent histories

== Metaphysics ==
objective and subjective
ontic and epistemic
intrinsic and extrinsic
agnostic
Philosophical realism
determinism
causality
empiricism
rationalism
scientific realism
psychophysical parallelism

== Interpretations of quantum mechanics ==
List of interpretations:

Bohmian Mechanics
de Broglie–Bohm theory
consistent histories
Copenhagen interpretation
conventional interpretation
Usually refer to the Copenhagen interpretation.
Ensemble Interpretation
Everett interpretation
See relative-state interpretation.
hydrodynamic interpretation
Ghirardi–Rimini–Weber theory (GRW theory / GRW effect)
many-worlds interpretation
many-minds interpretation
many-measurements interpretation
modal interpretations
objective collapse theory
orthodox interpretation
Usually refer to the Copenhagen interpretation.
Penrose interpretation
Pilot wave
Quantum logic
relative-state interpretation
relational quantum mechanics
stochastic interpretation
transactional interpretation

== Uncategorized items ==
quantum Darwinism
completeness
relativistic measurement theory
consciousness and observer role
quantum correlation
quantum indeterminism
stochastic collapse
pointer state
quantum causality
postselection
entropy
quantum cosmology

== People ==
Early researchers (before the 1950s):

- Max Born
- Albert Einstein
- Niels Bohr
- J. S. Bell
- Hugh Everett III
- David Bohm

1950s–2010s:

- Roland Omnès
- W. H. Zurek
- Erich Joos
- Max Tegmark
- Maximilian Schlosshauer
- H. D. Zeh
- David Deutsch
- Robert B. Griffiths
- Bernard d'Espagnat
- Carl von Weizsäcker

2000s or later:

- Bob Coecke
- Robert Spekkens

== See also ==
- time arrow
- quantum chaos
- probability interpretations
  - relative frequency approach
  - probability theory as extended logic, decision theory
- history of quantum mechanics
