= Interpretations of quantum mechanics =

Area of physical and philosophical debate

An interpretation of quantum mechanics is an attempt to explain how the mathematical theory of quantum mechanics might correspond to experienced reality. Quantum mechanics has held up to rigorous and extremely precise tests in an extraordinarily broad range of experiments. However, there exist a number of contending schools of thought over their interpretation. These interpretations differ on such fundamental questions as whether quantum mechanics is deterministic or stochastic, local or nonlocal, which elements of quantum mechanics can be considered real, and what the nature of measurement is, among other matters.

While some variation of the Copenhagen interpretation is commonly presented in textbooks, many other interpretations have been developed. Despite a century of debate and experiment, no consensus has been reached among physicists and philosophers of physics concerning which interpretation best "represents" reality.

== History ==
Influential figures in the interpretation of quantum mechanics

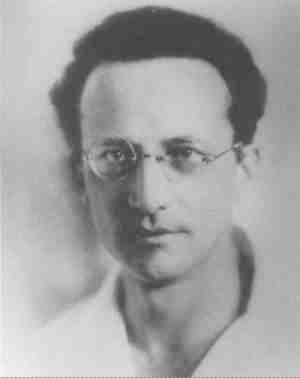
Erwin Schrödinger

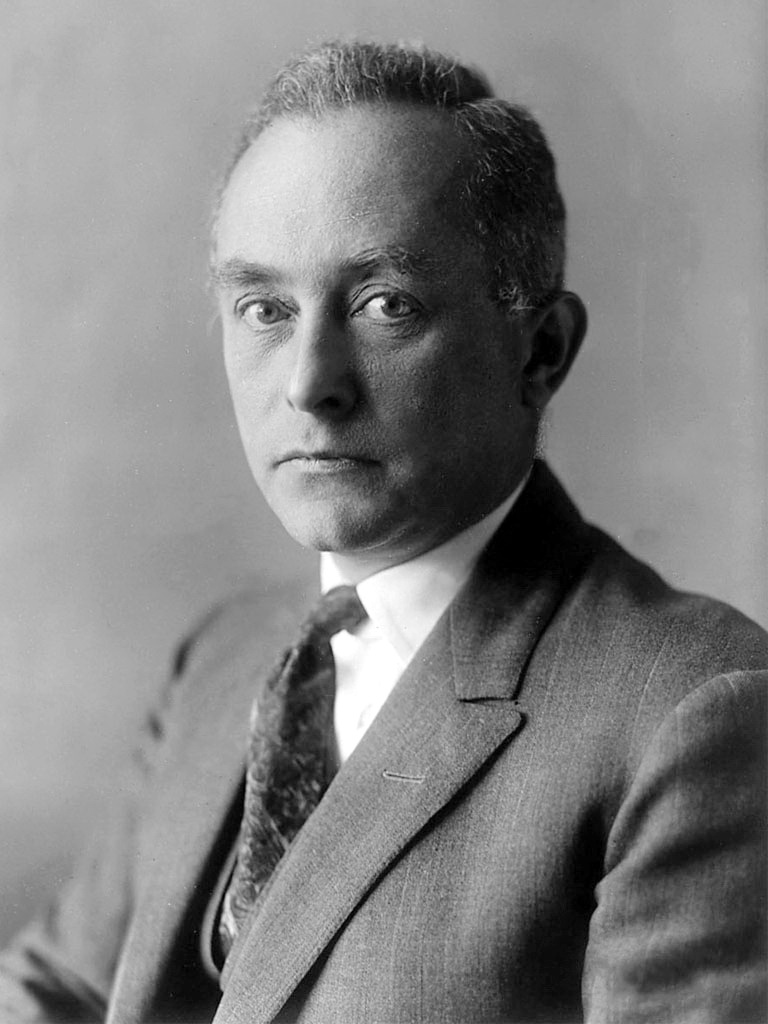
Max Born

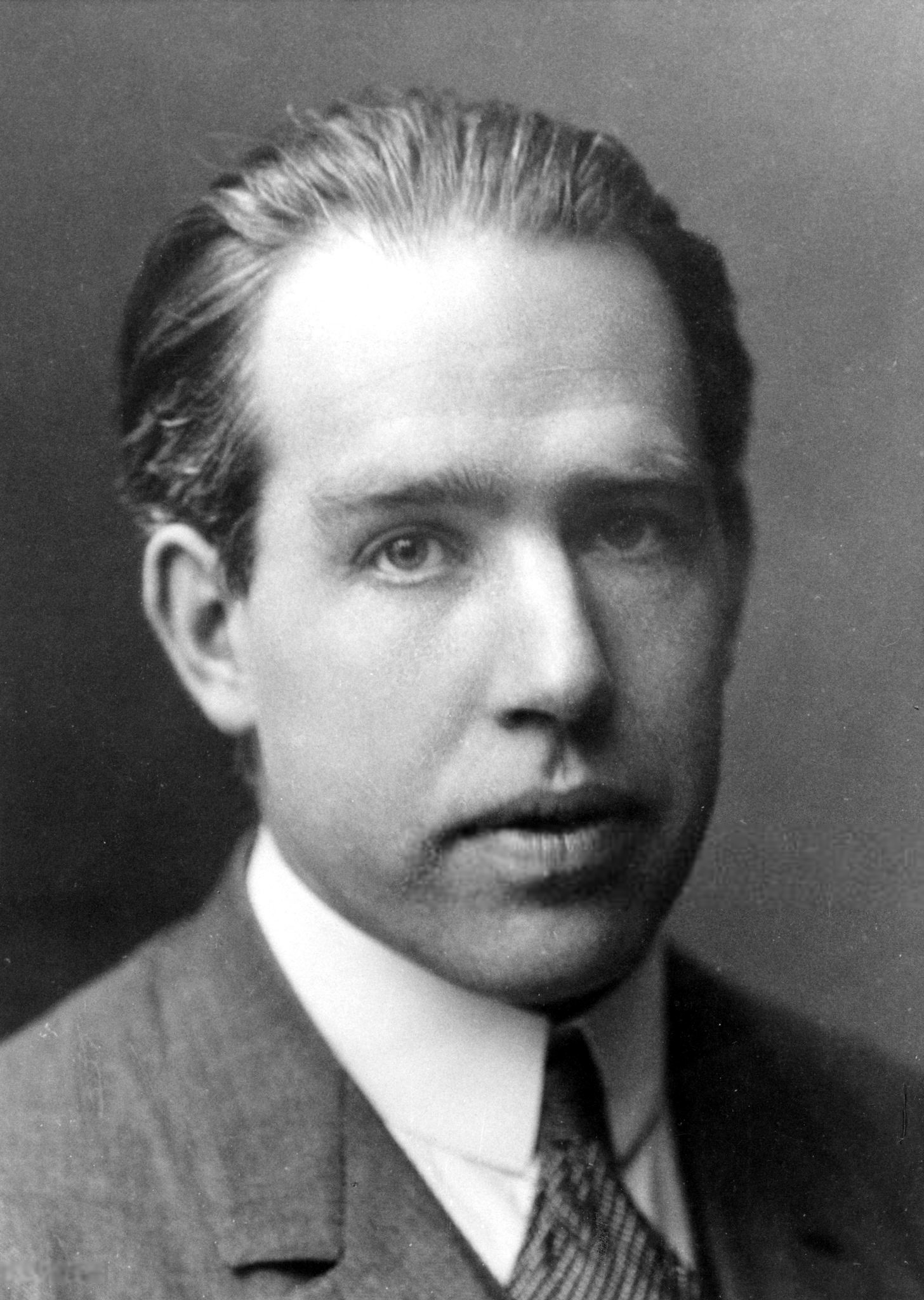
Niels Bohr

The definition of quantum theorists' terms, such as wave function and matrix mechanics, progressed through many stages. For instance, Erwin Schrödinger originally viewed the electron's wave function as its charge density smeared across space, but Max Born reinterpreted the absolute square value of the wave function as the electron's probability density distributed across space; the Born rule, as it is now called, matched experiment, whereas Schrödinger's charge density view did not.

The views of several early pioneers of quantum mechanics, such as Niels Bohr and Werner Heisenberg, are often grouped together as the "Copenhagen interpretation", though physicists and historians of physics have argued that this terminology obscures differences between the views so designated. Copenhagen-type ideas were never universally embraced, and challenges to a perceived Copenhagen orthodoxy gained increasing attention in the 1950s with the pilot-wave interpretation of David Bohm and the many-worlds interpretation of Hugh Everett III.

The physicist N. David Mermin once quipped, "New interpretations appear every year. None ever disappear." (Mermin also coined the saying "Shut up and calculate" to describe many physicists' attitude to interpretations of quantum theory, a remark which is often misattributed to Richard Feynman.)

As a rough guide to development of the mainstream view during the 1990s and 2000s, a "snapshot" of opinions was collected in a poll by Schlosshauer et al. at the "Quantum Physics and the Nature of Reality" conference of July 2011. The authors reference a similarly informal poll carried out by Max Tegmark at the "Fundamental Problems in Quantum Theory" conference in August 1997. The main conclusion of the authors is that the Copenhagen interpretation still prevails, receiving the most votes in their poll (42%), besides the rise to mainstream notability of the many-worlds interpretations: "The Copenhagen interpretation still reigns supreme here, especially if we lump it together with intellectual offsprings such as information-based interpretations and the QBism interpretation. In Tegmark's poll, the Everett interpretation received 17% of the vote, which is similar to the number of votes (18%) in our poll."

Some concepts originating from studies of interpretations have found more practical application in quantum information science.

== Interpretive challenges ==
1. Abstract, mathematical nature of quantum field theories: the mathematical structure of quantum mechanics is abstract and does not result in a single, clear interpretation of its quantities.
2. Apparent indeterministic and irreversible processes: in classical field theory, a physical property at a given location in the field is readily derived. In most mathematical formulations of quantum mechanics, measurement (understood as an interaction with a given state) has a special role in the theory, as it is the sole process that can cause a nonunitary, irreversible evolution of the state.
3. Role of the observer in determining outcomes. Copenhagen-type interpretations imply that the wavefunction is a calculational tool, and represents reality only immediately after a measurement performed by an observer. Everettian interpretations grant that all possible outcomes are real, and that measurement-type interactions cause a branching process in which each possibility is realised.
4. Classically unexpected correlations between remote objects: entangled quantum systems, as illustrated in the EPR paradox, obey statistics that seem to violate principles of local causality by action at a distance.
5. Complementarity of proffered descriptions: complementarity holds that no set of classical physical concepts can simultaneously refer to all properties of a quantum system. For instance, wave description A and particulate description B can each describe quantum system S, but not simultaneously. This implies the composition of physical properties of S does not obey the rules of classical propositional logic when using propositional connectives (see "Quantum logic"). Like contextuality, the "origin of complementarity lies in the non-commutativity of operators" that describe quantum objects.
6. Contextual behaviour of systems locally: Quantum contextuality demonstrates that classical intuitions, in which properties of a system hold definite values independent of the manner of their measurement, fail even for local systems. Also, physical principles such as Leibniz's Principle of the identity of indiscernibles no longer apply in the quantum domain, signaling that most classical intuitions may be incorrect about the quantum world.
7. Role of time: time enters the formalism of quantum mechanics as an external parameter rather than as an observable; by an argument due to Wolfgang Pauli, no self-adjoint time operator exists when the Hamiltonian is bounded below. Statements such as "instantaneous collapse" therefore refer to this parameter in a chosen reference frame rather than to a measurable simultaneity; which distant events count as simultaneous with a collapse is frame-dependent.

== Influential interpretations ==
=== Copenhagen interpretation ===
The Copenhagen interpretation is a collection of views about the meaning of quantum mechanics principally attributed to Niels Bohr and Werner Heisenberg. It is one of the oldest attitudes towards quantum mechanics, as features of it date to the development of quantum mechanics during 1925–1927, and it remains one of the most commonly taught. There is no definitive historical statement of what is the Copenhagen interpretation, and there were in particular fundamental disagreements between the views of Bohr and Heisenberg. For example, Heisenberg emphasized a sharp "cut" between the observer (or the instrument) and the system being observed, while Bohr offered an interpretation that is independent of a subjective observer or measurement or collapse, which relies on an "irreversible" or effectively irreversible process that imparts the classical behavior of "observation" or "measurement".

Features common to Copenhagen-type interpretations include the idea that quantum mechanics is intrinsically indeterministic, with probabilities calculated using the Born rule, and the principle of complementarity, which states certain pairs of complementary properties cannot all be observed or measured simultaneously. Moreover, properties only result from the act of "observing" or "measuring"; the theory avoids assuming definite values from unperformed experiments. Copenhagen-type interpretations hold that quantum descriptions are objective, in that they are independent of physicists' mental arbitrariness. The statistical interpretation of wavefunctions due to Max Born differs sharply from Schrödinger's original intent, which was to have a theory with continuous time evolution and in which wavefunctions directly described physical reality.

=== Many worlds ===
The many-worlds interpretation is an interpretation of quantum mechanics in which a universal wavefunction obeys the same deterministic, reversible laws at all times; in particular there is no (indeterministic and irreversible) wavefunction collapse associated with measurement. The phenomena associated with measurement are claimed to be explained by decoherence, which occurs when states interact with the environment. More precisely, the parts of the wavefunction describing observers become increasingly entangled with the parts of the wavefunction describing their experiments. Although all possible outcomes of experiments continue to lie in the wavefunction's support, the times at which they become correlated with observers effectively "split" the universe into mutually unobservable alternate histories.

=== Quantum information theories ===
Quantum information approaches view the quantum state as a representation of information and measurement as the process of updating that information.

These approaches are subdivided into two main categories:

The first category consists of information ontologies, exemplified by J. A. Wheeler's "it from bit" concept, which have been described as a revival of immaterialism.

The second category comprises epistemic interpretations which propose that quantum mechanics describes an observer's knowledge of the world rather than the world itself. Within these frameworks, wavefunction collapse (also known as the reduction of the state vector) is often interpreted as an observer acquiring information from a measurement rather than as an objective physical event. As summarised by James Hartle:

The state is not an objective property of an individual system but is that information, obtained from a knowledge of how a system was prepared, which can be used for making predictions about future measurements. ...A quantum mechanical state being a summary of the observer's information about an individual physical system changes both by dynamical laws, and whenever the observer acquires new information about the system through the process of measurement. The existence of two laws for the evolution of the state vector ... becomes problematical only if it is believed that the state vector is an objective property of the system ... The "reduction of the wavepacket" does take place in the consciousness of the observer, not because of any unique physical process which takes place there, but only because the state is a construct of the observer and not an objective property of the physical system.

A program associated with these approaches is “quantum reconstruction” which seeks to derive the formalism of quantum mechanics from such information-theoretic axioms.

=== Relational quantum mechanics ===
The essential idea behind relational quantum mechanics, following the precedent of special relativity, is that different observers may give different accounts of the same series of events: for example, to one observer at a given point in time, a system may be in a single, "collapsed" eigenstate, while to another observer at the same time, it may be in a superposition of two or more states. Consequently, if quantum mechanics is to be a complete theory, relational quantum mechanics argues that the notion of "state" describes not the observed system itself, but the relationship, or correlation, between the system and its observer(s). The state vector of conventional quantum mechanics becomes a description of the correlation of some degrees of freedom in the observer, with respect to the observed system. However, it is held by relational quantum mechanics that this applies to all physical objects, whether or not they are conscious or macroscopic. Any "measurement event" is seen simply as an ordinary physical interaction, an establishment of the sort of correlation discussed above. Thus the physical content of the theory has to do not with objects themselves, but the relations between them.

=== QBism ===
QBism (pronounced cube-ism), which originally stood for "quantum Bayesianism", is an interpretation of quantum mechanics that takes an agent's actions and experiences as the central concerns of the theory. This interpretation is distinguished by its use of a subjective Bayesian account of probabilities to understand the quantum mechanical Born rule as a normative addition to good decision-making. QBism draws from the fields of quantum information and Bayesian probability and aims to eliminate the interpretational conundrums that have beset quantum theory.

QBism deals with common questions in the interpretation of quantum theory about the nature of wavefunction superposition, quantum measurement, and entanglement. According to QBism, many, but not all, aspects of the quantum formalism are subjective in nature. For example, in this interpretation, a quantum state is not an element of reality—instead it represents the degrees of belief an agent has about the possible outcomes of measurements. For this reason, some philosophers of science have deemed QBism a form of anti-realism. The originators of the interpretation disagree with this characterization, proposing instead that the theory more properly aligns with a kind of realism they call "participatory realism", wherein reality consists of more than can be captured by any putative third-person account of it.

=== Consistent histories ===
The consistent histories interpretation generalizes the conventional Copenhagen interpretation and attempts to provide a natural interpretation of quantum cosmology. The theory is based on a consistency criterion that allows the history of a system to be described so that the probabilities for each history obey the additive rules of classical probability. It is claimed to be consistent with the Schrödinger equation.

According to this interpretation, the purpose of a quantum-mechanical theory is to predict the relative probabilities of various alternative histories (for example, of a particle).

=== Ensemble interpretation ===
The ensemble interpretation, also called the statistical interpretation, can be viewed as a minimalist interpretation. That is, it claims to make the fewest assumptions associated with the standard mathematics. It takes the statistical interpretation of Born to the fullest extent. The interpretation states that the wave function does not apply to an individual system – for example, a single particle – but is an abstract statistical quantity that only applies to an ensemble (a vast multitude) of similarly prepared systems or particles. In the words of Einstein:

The attempt to conceive the quantum-theoretical description as the complete description of the individual systems leads to unnatural theoretical interpretations, which become immediately unnecessary if one accepts the interpretation that the description refers to ensembles of systems and not to individual systems.

— Einstein in Albert Einstein: Philosopher-Scientist, ed. P.A. Schilpp (Harper & Row, New York)

The most prominent current advocate of the ensemble interpretation is Leslie E. Ballentine, professor at Simon Fraser University, author of the text book Quantum Mechanics, A Modern Development.

=== De Broglie–Bohm theory ===
The de Broglie–Bohm theory of quantum mechanics (also known as the pilot wave theory) is a theory by Louis de Broglie and extended later by David Bohm to include measurements. Particles, which always have positions, are guided by the wavefunction. The wavefunction evolves according to the Schrödinger wave equation, and the wavefunction never collapses. The theory takes place in a single spacetime, is non-local, and is deterministic. The simultaneous determination of a particle's position and velocity is subject to the usual uncertainty principle constraint. The theory is considered to be a hidden-variable theory, and by embracing non-locality it reproduces the quantum-mechanical violation of Bell's inequality. The measurement problem is resolved, since the particles have definite positions at all times. Collapse is explained as phenomenological. In quantum equilibrium the theory makes the same predictions as standard quantum mechanics, so that experiments do not distinguish it from indeterministic interpretations.

=== Transactional interpretation ===
The transactional interpretation of quantum mechanics (TIQM) by John G. Cramer is an interpretation of quantum mechanics inspired by the Wheeler–Feynman absorber theory. It describes the collapse of the wave function as resulting from a time-symmetric transaction between a possibility wave from the source to the receiver (the wave function) and a possibility wave from the receiver to source (the complex conjugate of the wave function). This interpretation of quantum mechanics is unique in that it not only views the wave function as a real entity, but the complex conjugate of the wave function, which appears in the Born rule for calculating the expected value for an observable, as also real.

=== Consciousness causes collapse ===
Eugene Wigner argued that human experimenter consciousness (or maybe even animal consciousness) was critical for the collapse of the wavefunction, but he later abandoned this interpretation after learning about quantum decoherence. Some specific proposals for consciousness caused wave-function collapse have been shown to be unfalsifiable and more broadly reasonable assumption about consciousness lead to the same conclusion.

=== Quantum logic ===
Quantum logic can be regarded as a kind of propositional logic suitable for understanding the apparent anomalies regarding quantum measurement, most notably those concerning composition of measurement operations of complementary variables. This research area and its name originated in the 1936 paper by Garrett Birkhoff and John von Neumann, who attempted to reconcile some of the apparent inconsistencies of classical Boolean logic with the facts related to measurement and observation in quantum mechanics.

=== Modal interpretations of quantum theory ===
Modal interpretations of quantum mechanics were first conceived of in 1972 by Bas van Fraassen, in his paper "A formal approach to the philosophy of science". Van Fraassen introduced a distinction between a dynamical state, which describes what might be true about a system and which always evolves according to the Schrödinger equation, and a value state, which indicates what is actually true about a system at a given time. The term "modal interpretation" now is used to describe a larger set of models that grew out of this approach. The Stanford Encyclopedia of Philosophy describes several versions, including proposals by Simon B. Kochen, Dennis Dieks, Rob Clifton, Michael Dickson, and Jeffrey Bub. According to Michel Bitbol, Schrödinger's views on how to interpret quantum mechanics progressed through as many as four stages, ending with a non-collapse view that in respects resembles the interpretations of Everett and Van Fraassen. Because Schrödinger subscribed to a kind of post-Machian neutral monism, in which "matter" and "mind" are only different aspects or arrangements of the same common elements, treating the wavefunction as ontic and treating it as epistemic became interchangeable.

=== Time-symmetric theories ===
Time-symmetric interpretations of quantum mechanics were first suggested by Walter Schottky in 1921. Several theories have been proposed that modify the equations of quantum mechanics to be symmetric with respect to time reversal. (See Wheeler–Feynman time-symmetric theory.) This creates retrocausality: events in the future can affect ones in the past, exactly as events in the past can affect ones in the future. In these theories, a single measurement cannot fully determine the state of a system (making them a type of hidden-variables theory), but given two measurements performed at different times, it is possible to calculate the exact state of the system at all intermediate times. The collapse of the wavefunction is therefore not a physical change to the system, just a change in our knowledge of it due to the second measurement. Similarly, they explain entanglement as not being a true physical state but just an illusion created by ignoring retrocausality. The point where two particles appear to "become entangled" is simply a point where each particle is being influenced by events that occur to the other particle in the future.

Not all advocates of time-symmetric causality favour modifying the unitary dynamics of standard quantum mechanics. Thus a leading exponent of the two-state vector formalism, Lev Vaidman, states that the two-state vector formalism dovetails well with Hugh Everett's many-worlds interpretation.

=== Other interpretations ===
As well as the mainstream interpretations discussed above, a number of other interpretations have been proposed that have not made a significant scientific impact for whatever reason. These range from proposals by mainstream physicists to the more occult ideas of quantum mysticism.

== Related concepts ==
Some ideas are discussed in the context of interpreting quantum mechanics but are not necessarily regarded as interpretations themselves.

=== Quantum Darwinism ===
Quantum Darwinism is a theory meant to explain the emergence of the classical world from the quantum world as due to a process of Darwinian natural selection induced by the environment interacting with the quantum system; where the many possible quantum states are selected against in favor of a stable pointer state. It was proposed in 2003 by Wojciech Zurek and a group of collaborators including Ollivier, Poulin, Paz and Blume-Kohout. The development of the theory is due to the integration of a number of Zurek's research topics pursued over the course of twenty-five years including pointer states, einselection and decoherence.

=== Objective-collapse theories ===
Objective-collapse theories differ from the Copenhagen interpretation by regarding both the wave function and the process of collapse as ontologically objective (meaning these exist and occur independent of the observer). In objective theories, collapse occurs either randomly ("spontaneous localization") or when some physical threshold is reached, with observers having no special role. Thus, objective-collapse theories are realistic, indeterministic, no-hidden-variables theories. Standard quantum mechanics does not specify any mechanism of collapse; quantum mechanics would need to be extended if objective collapse is correct. The requirement for an extension means that objective-collapse theories are alternatives to quantum mechanics rather than interpretations of it. Examples include

- the Ghirardi–Rimini–Weber theory
- the continuous spontaneous localization model
- the Penrose interpretation

== Comparisons ==
The most common interpretations are summarized in the table below. The values shown in the cells of the table are not without controversy, for the precise meanings of some of the concepts involved are unclear and, in fact, are themselves at the center of the controversy surrounding the given interpretation. For another table comparing interpretations of quantum theory, see reference.

No experimental evidence exists that distinguishes among these interpretations. To that extent, the physical theory stands, and is consistent with itself and with reality. Nevertheless, designing experiments that would test the various interpretations is the subject of active research.

Most of these interpretations have variants. For example, it is difficult to get a precise definition of the Copenhagen interpretation as it was developed and argued by many people.

Interpretation	Year published	Author(s)	Deterministic?	Ontic wavefunction?	Unique history?	Hidden variables?	Collapsing wavefunctions?	Observer role?	Local dynamics?	Counterfactually definite?	Extant universal wavefunction?
Ensemble interpretation	1926	Max Born	Agnostic	No	Yes	Agnostic	No	No	No	No	No
Copenhagen interpretation	1927	Niels Bohr, Werner Heisenberg	No	Some	Yes	No	Some	No	Yes	No	No
De Broglie–Bohm theory	1927– 1952	Louis de Broglie, David Bohm	Yes	Yes (Note: Both particle AND guiding wavefunction are real.)	Yes (Note: Unique particle history, but multiple wave histories.)	Yes	Phenomenological	No	No	Yes	Yes
Quantum logic	1936	Garrett Birkhoff	Agnostic	Agnostic	Yes (Note: But quantum logic is more limited in applicability than Coherent Histories.)	No	No	Interpretational (Note: Quantum mechanics is regarded as a way of predicting observations, or a theory of measurement.)	Agnostic	No	No
Many-worlds interpretation	1957	Hugh Everett	Yes	Yes	No	No	No	No	Yes	Ill-posed	Yes
Consciousness causes collapse	1961– 1993	Eugene Wigner, Henry Stapp	No	Yes	Yes	No	Yes	Causal	No	No	Yes
Many-minds interpretation	1970	H. Dieter Zeh	Yes	Yes	No	No	No	Interpretational (Note: Observers separate the universal wavefunction into orthogonal sets of experiences.)	Yes	Ill-posed	Yes
Consistent histories	1984	Robert B. Griffiths	No	No	No	No	No (Note: In the consistent histories interpretation the collapse is a legitimate calculational procedure when describing the preparation of a quantum system, but it amounts to nothing more than a convenient way of calculating conditional probabilities.)	No (Note: In the consistent histories interpretation, observers are necessary to select a specific family of consistent histories (i.e., a framework), thus enabling the calculation of probabilities of physical events. Observers, however, play a purely passive role, similar to a photographer choosing a particular framing when taking a picture.)	Yes	No	Yes
Transactional interpretation	1986	John G. Cramer	No	Yes	Yes	No	Yes (Note: In the TI the collapse of the state vector is interpreted as the completion of the transaction between emitter and absorber.)	No	No (Note: The transactional interpretation is explicitly non-local.)	Yes	No
Objective-collapse theories	1986– 1989	Giancarlo Ghirardi, Alberto Rimini, Tullio Weber, Roger Penrose	No	Yes	Yes	No	Yes	No	No	No	No
Relational interpretation	1994	Carlo Rovelli	No	No	Agnostic (Note: Comparing histories between systems in this interpretation has no well-defined meaning.)	No	Yes (Note: Any physical interaction is treated as a collapse event relative to the systems involved, not just macroscopic or conscious observers.)	Intrinsic (Note: The state of the system is observer-dependent, i.e., the state is specific to the reference frame of the observer.)	Possibly (Note: The interpretation was originally presented as local, but whether locality is well-posed in RQM has been disputed.)	No	No
QBism	2010	Christopher Fuchs, Rüdiger Schack	No	No (Note: A wavefunction merely encodes an agent’s expectations for future experiences. It is no more real than a probability distribution is in subjective Bayesianism.)	Agnostic (Note: Quantum theory is a tool any agent may use to help manage their expectations. The past comes into play only insofar as an agent’s individual experiences and temperament influence their priors.)	No	Yes (Note: Although QBism would eschew this terminology. A change in the wavefunction that an agent ascribes to a system as a result of having an experience represents a change in his or her beliefs about further experiences they may have. See Doxastic logic.)	Intrinsic (Note: Observers, or more properly, participants, are as essential to the formalism as the systems they interact with.)	Yes	No	No

== The silent approach ==
Although interpretational opinions are openly and widely discussed today, that was not always the case. A notable exponent of a tendency of silence was Paul Dirac who once wrote: "The interpretation of quantum mechanics has been dealt with by many authors, and I do not want to discuss it here. I want to deal with more fundamental things." This position is shared with other well-known practitioners of quantum mechanics like Max Born, Richard Feynman, Willis Lamb, and John Clive Ward. Feynman wrote many popularizations of quantum mechanics without ever publishing about interpretation issues like quantum measurement. Others, like Nico van Kampen and Lamb, have openly criticized non-orthodox interpretations of quantum mechanics.

== See also ==
- Bohr–Einstein debates
- Einstein's thought experiments
- Glossary of quantum philosophy
- Local hidden-variable theory
- List of unsolved problems in physics#Foundations of physics
- Popper's experiment
- Christopher A. Fuchs
- Superdeterminism
- Quantum foundations

== Sources ==
- Bub, J.; Clifton, R. (1996). "A uniqueness theorem for interpretations of quantum mechanics". Studies in History and Philosophy of Modern Physics. 27B: 181–219. doi:10.1016/1355-2198(95)00019-4.
- Rudolf Carnap, 1939, "The interpretation of physics", in Foundations of Logic and Mathematics of the International Encyclopedia of Unified Science. Chicago, Illinois: University of Chicago Press.
- Dickson, M., 1994, "Wavefunction tails in the modal interpretation" in Hull, D., Forbes, M., and Burian, R., eds., Proceedings of the PSA 1" 366–376. East Lansing, Michigan: Philosophy of Science Association.
- --------, and Clifton, R., 1998, "Lorentz-invariance in modal interpretations" in Dieks, D. and Vermaas, P., eds., The Modal Interpretation of Quantum Mechanics. Dordrecht: Kluwer Academic Publishers: 9–48.
- Fuchs, Christopher, 2002, "Quantum Mechanics as Quantum Information (and only a little more)". arXiv:quant-ph/0205039
- --------, and A. Peres, 2000, "Quantum theory needs no 'interpretation'", Physics Today.
- Herbert, N., 1985. Quantum Reality: Beyond the New Physics. New York: Doubleday. ISBN 0-385-23569-0.
- Hey, Anthony, and Walters, P., 2003. The New Quantum Universe, 2nd ed. Cambridge University Press. ISBN 0-521-56457-3.
- Jackiw, Roman; Kleppner, D. (2000). "One Hundred Years of Quantum Physics". Science. 289 (5481): 893–898. arXiv:quant-ph/0008092. Bibcode:2000quant.ph..8092K. doi:10.1126/science.289.5481.893. PMID 17839156. S2CID 6604344.
- Max Jammer, 1966. The Conceptual Development of Quantum Mechanics. McGraw-Hill.
- --------, 1974. The Philosophy of Quantum Mechanics. Wiley & Sons.
- Al-Khalili, 2003. Quantum: A Guide for the Perplexed. London: Weidenfeld & Nicolson.
- de Muynck, W. M., 2002. Foundations of quantum mechanics, an empiricist approach. Dordrecht: Kluwer Academic Publishers. ISBN 1-4020-0932-1.
- Roland Omnès, 1999. Understanding Quantum Mechanics. Princeton, New Jersey: Princeton University Press.
- Karl Popper, 1963. Conjectures and Refutations. London: Routledge and Kegan Paul. The chapter "Three views Concerning Human Knowledge" addresses, among other things, instrumentalism in the physical sciences.
- Hans Reichenbach, 1944. Philosophic Foundations of Quantum Mechanics. University of California Press.
- Tegmark, Max; Wheeler, J. A. (2001). "100 Years of Quantum Mysteries". Scientific American. 284 (2): 68–75. arXiv:quant-ph/0101077. Bibcode:2001SciAm.284b..68T. doi:10.1038/scientificamerican0201-68. S2CID 119375538.
- Bas van Fraassen, 1972, "A formal approach to the philosophy of science", in R. Colodny, ed., Paradigms and Paradoxes: The Philosophical Challenge of the Quantum Domain. Univ. of Pittsburgh Press: 303–366.
- John A. Wheeler and Wojciech Hubert Zurek (eds), Quantum Theory and Measurement, Princeton, New Jersey: Princeton University Press, ISBN 0-691-08316-9, LoC QC174.125.Q38 1983.
