= Quantum discord =

Measure of nonclassical correlations between two subsystems of a quantum system

In quantum information theory, quantum discord is a measure of nonclassical correlations between two subsystems of a quantum system. It includes correlations that are due to quantum physical effects but do not necessarily involve quantum entanglement.

The notion of quantum discord was introduced by Harold Ollivier and Wojciech H. Zurek and, independently by Leah Henderson and Vlatko Vedral. Olliver and Zurek referred to it also as a measure of quantumness of correlations. From the work of these two research groups it follows that quantum correlations can be present in certain mixed separable states; In other words, separability alone does not imply the absence of quantum correlations. The notion of quantum discord thus goes beyond the earlier distinction between entangled and separable (non-entangled) quantum states.

== Definition and mathematical relations ==
Individual (H(X), H(Y)), joint (H(X, Y)), and conditional entropies for a pair of correlated subsystems X, Y with mutual information I(X; Y).

In mathematical terms, quantum discord is defined in terms of the quantum mutual information. More specifically, quantum discord is the difference between two expressions which each, in the classical limit, represent the mutual information. These two expressions are:

$$I (A; B) = H (A) + H (B) - H (A,B)$$
$$J (A; B) = H (A) - H (A|B)$$

where, in the classical case, H(A) is the information entropy, H(A, B) the joint entropy and H(A|B) the conditional entropy, and the two expressions yield identical results. In the nonclassical case, the quantum physics analogy for the three terms are used – S(ρ_{A}) the von Neumann entropy, S(ρ) the joint quantum entropy and S(ρ_{A}|ρ_{B}) a quantum generalization of conditional entropy (not to be confused with conditional quantum entropy), respectively, for density matrix (or density operator) ρ;

$$I (\rho) = S (\rho_A) + S (\rho_B) - S (\rho)$$
$$J_A (\rho) = S (\rho_B) - S (\rho_B|\rho_A)$$

The difference between the two expressions defines the basis-dependent quantum discord

$$\mathcal D_A (\rho) = I (\rho) - J_{A}(\rho),$$

which is asymmetrical in the sense that $\mathcal D_A (\rho)$ can differ from $\mathcal D_B (\rho)$. The notation J represents the part of the correlations that can be attributed to classical correlations and varies in dependence on the chosen eigenbasis; therefore, in order for the quantum discord to reflect the purely nonclassical correlations independently of basis, it is necessary that J first be maximized over the set of all possible projective measurements onto the eigenbasis:

$$\mathcal D_A (\rho) = I (\rho) - \max_{\{\Pi_j^A\}} J_{\{\Pi_j^A\}} (\rho) = S (\rho_A) - S(\rho) + \min_{\{\Pi_j^A\}} S (\rho_{B | \{\Pi_j^A\}} )$$

Nonzero quantum discord indicates the presence of correlations that are due to noncommutativity of quantum operators. For pure states, the quantum discord becomes a measure of quantum entanglement, more specifically, in that case it equals the entropy of entanglement.

Vanishing quantum discord is a criterion for the pointer states, which constitute preferred effectively classical states of a system. Quantum discord must be non-negative and states with vanishing quantum discord can in fact be identified with pointer states. Other conditions have been identified which can be seen in analogy to the Peres–Horodecki criterion and in relation to the strong subadditivity of the von Neumann entropy.

Efforts have been made to extend the definition of quantum discord to continuous variable systems, in particular to bipartite systems described by Gaussian states. Work has demonstrated that the upper-bound of Gaussian discord indeed coincides with the actual quantum discord of a Gaussian state, when the latter belongs to a suitable large family of Gaussian states.

Computing quantum discord is NP-complete and hence difficult to compute in the general case. For certain classes of two-qubit states, quantum discord can be calculated analytically.

== Properties ==
Zurek provided a physical interpretation for discord by showing that it "determines the difference between the efficiency of quantum and classical Maxwell's demons...in extracting work from collections of correlated quantum systems".

Discord can also be viewed in operational terms as an "entanglement consumption in an extended quantum state merging protocol". Providing evidence for non-entanglement quantum correlations normally involves elaborate quantum tomography methods; however, in 2011, such correlations could be demonstrated experimentally in a room temperature nuclear magnetic resonance system, using chloroform molecules that represent a two-qubit quantum system. Non-linear classicality witnesses have been implemented with Bell-state measurements in photonic systems.

Quantum discord has been seen as a possible basis for the performance in terms of quantum computation ascribed to certain mixed-state quantum systems, with a mixed quantum state representing a statistical ensemble of pure states (see quantum statistical mechanics). The view that quantum discord can be a resource for quantum processors was further cemented in 2012, where experiments established that discord between bipartite systems can be consumed to encode information that can only be accessed by coherent quantum interactions. Quantum discord is an indicator of minimum coherence in one subsystem of a composite quantum system and as such it plays a resource role in interferometric schemes of phase estimation. A recent work has identified quantum discord as a resource for quantum cryptography, being able to guarantee the security of quantum key distribution in the complete absence of entanglement.

Quantum discord is in some ways different from quantum entanglement. Quantum discord is more resilient to dissipative environments than is quantum entanglement. This has been shown for Markovian environments as well as for non-Markovian environments based on a comparison of the dynamics of discord with that of concurrence, where discord has proven to be more robust. At least for certain models of a qubit pair which is in thermal equilibrium and form an open quantum system in contact with a heat bath, the quantum discord increases with temperature in certain ranges, displaying behavior quite in contrast to that of entanglement, and, surprisingly, the classical correlation actually decreases as the quantum discord increases. Nonzero quantum discord can persist even in the limit of one of the subsystems undergoing an infinite acceleration, whereas under this condition the quantum entanglement drops to zero due to the Unruh effect.

Quantum discord has been studied in quantum many-body systems. Its behavior reflects quantum phase transitions and other properties of quantum spin chains and beyond.

== Alternative measures ==
An operational measure, in terms of distillation of local pure states, is the 'quantum deficit'. The one-way and zero-way versions were shown to be equal to the relative entropy of quantumness.

Other measures of nonclassical correlations include the measurement induced disturbance (MID) measure and the localized noneffective unitary (LNU) distance and various entropy-based measures.

There exists a geometric indicator of discord based on Hilbert-Schmidt distance, which obeys a factorization law, can be put in relation to von Neumann measurements, but is not in general a faithful measure.

Faithful, computable and operational measures of discord-type correlations are the local quantum uncertainty and the interferometric power.

== Multipartite Generalizations ==
The original definition of quantum discord is only defined for bipartite systems. The multipartite generalization for $N$ parties was performed by Radhakrishnan, Lauriere, and Byrnes and has the definition

$$\mathcal D_{A_1; A_2; \dots; A_N} (\rho) = \min_{\{\Pi^{A_1 \dots A_{N-1}} \}} [ -S_{A_2 \dots A_N | A_1} (\rho) + S_{A_2 | \Pi^{A_1} } (\rho) + \dots + S_{A_N | \Pi^{A_1 \dots A_{N-1}}} (\rho) ] ,$$

where we introduced the notation for the conditional entropy without measurement as

$$S_{B|A} (\rho) = S(\rho)  - S (\rho_{A})$$

and conditional entropy with measurement as

$$S_{B|\Pi^A} (\rho) = \sum_{j} p_{j}^A S (\Pi_{j}^{A} \rho \Pi_{j}^{A}/p_{j}^A ) .$$

The measurements are minimized over all conditional measurements

$$\Pi^{A_1\dots A_{N-1}}_{j_1 \dots j_{N-1}} = \Pi^{A_1}_{j_1} \otimes \Pi^{A_2}_{j_2|j_1}  \dots \otimes \Pi^{A_{N-1}}_{j_{N-1}|j_1\dots j_{N-2}}$$

and take place in the order $A_1 \rightarrow A_2 \rightarrow \dots A_{N-1}$. For conditional measurements, the basis can be adaptively changed depending on the outcome of the previous measurement. This type of measurement ensures that multipartite discord is (i) zero iff the state is a classically correlated state; (ii) a non-negative quantity; (iii) reduces to the standard definition of discord for bipartite-like correlated subsystems.
