= Quantum Philosophy =

Book by Roland Omnès

Quantum Philosophy is a 2002 book by French physicist Roland Omnès, which aims to show the reader how modern developments in quantum mechanics allow the recovery of a common sense view of the world.

== Book contents ==
- Section I – a review of mathematics, epistemology and science from the classical to the early modern period.
- Section II – a review of the ineluctable rise of formalism in mathematics and in fundamental physical science, which, Omnès argues, was not a choice, but was forced on researchers by the nature of the subject matter.
- Section III – the central section of the book, in which the recovery of common sense, as outlined below, is presented.
- Section IV – a short section of reflections on possible future steps.

== Central argument ==
Omnès' argues that modern science has, necessarily, become increasingly formal, as it strives to make itself an accurate reflection of the physical world. But he argues that we have now come near enough to scaling the "magnificent peaks" of the formal mathematics needed to describe reality for one thing to become clear: it is now possible to demonstrate, formally, and starting from the underlying principles of quantum mechanics, that the laws of classical logic, classical probability and classical dynamics apply to objects at the macroscopic level.

As Omnès makes explicit, this is the exact opposite of the classical epistemological project. It has always, up to now, been necessary to access reality by first presupposing the laws of classical common sense. Now we can enter the world either at the formal level, or at the classical level, and we find that each entails the other: experiment has led to the quantum formalism; the quantum formalism now, allows the recovery of the framework of classical reasoning under which the experiments took place.

Omnès emphasises throughout that no new principles, other than those described when quantum mechanics was developed in the 1920s, are needed. Moreover, some additional principles that seemed to be required then (such as wavefunction collapse or wavefunction reduction) are no longer needed. Classical behaviour can now be recovered in a system described entirely by a single, unitary (time-reversible) wavefunction.

The mathematical developments that allowed this progress have taken place in two fields: quantum decoherence and the consistent histories approach to quantum mechanics.

The consistent histories approach makes mathematically explicit which sets of classical questions can be consistently asked of a single quantum system, and, conversely, which sets of questions are fundamentally inconsistent, and thus meaningless when asked together. It is then demonstrated formally why it is that the questions that Einstein, Podolsky, and Rosen assumed could be asked together, of a single quantum system, simply cannot be asked together. It's then demonstrated that classical, logical reasoning often does apply, even to quantum experiments – but can now be mathematically exact about the limits of classical logic.

Quantum decoherence recovers classical behaviour at the macroscopic level. The formal mathematics of this approach demonstrates that is massively improbable for a macroscopic Schrödinger's cat to exist for longer than a minuscule time (related to the macroscopic energy dissipation time by a factor involving the square of the Planck constant) in a quantum superposition of its |alive⟩ and |dead⟩ states. Even for a cat otherwise isolated from the rest of the universe, and even with no observer present, there are multiple unknowns in the quantum state of the whole cat, that the relevant mathematics determine that only the normally observed classical states of the cat are at all probable, except over the very shortest of timescales. This reasoning is developed formally within measurement theory, and applies to any macroscopic, non-super cooled measuring device, whether or not there is an observer to watch it.

== Collaborators ==
Omnès makes clear that others contributed materially to the research described in his book, including Robert Griffiths, Murray Gell-Mann, and James Hartle.

== Publication details ==
- Quantum Philosophy: Understanding and Interpreting Contemporary Science (English Edition: Princeton University Press, 1999; French Edition: Gallimard, 1994). Translated to Persian by R. Roknizadeh and published in 2016 in Iran.
