= Many histories =

Many histories may refer to:

- The many worlds interpretation of quantum theory
- The consistent histories interpretation of quantum theory
- The sum over histories or path integral formulation of quantum theory
