= Quantum Darwinism =

Theory to explain the emergence of the classical world from the quantum world

Quantum Darwinism is a theory meant to explain the emergence of the classical world from the quantum world as due to a process of Darwinian natural selection induced by the environment interacting with the quantum system; where the many possible quantum states are selected against in favor of a stable pointer state. It was proposed in 2003 by Wojciech Zurek and a group of collaborators including Ollivier, Poulin, Paz and Blume-Kohout. The development of the theory is due to the integration of a number of Zurek's research topics pursued over the course of 25 years, including pointer states, einselection and decoherence.

A study in 2010 is claimed to provide preliminary supporting evidence of quantum Darwinism with scars of a quantum dot "becoming a family of mother-daughter states" indicating they could "stabilize into multiple pointer states"; additionally, a similar kind of scene has been suggested with perturbation-induced scarring in disordered quantum dots (see scars). This interpretation has been subject to criticism by philosopher of physics Ruth Kastner on grounds of circularity. Kastner argues that the decoherence process central to quantum Darwinism does not arise from unitary dynamics alone. It instead relies on an assumed partitioning of the system from its environment together with mutual randomization of environmental phases, features that presuppose classical distinctions not present in the quantum state of the universe as a whole. Such that, even if decoherence occurs, it doesn't clearly show that objective macroscopic pointer states emerge naturally without additional postulates such as wave-function collapse. (See Implications below.)

== Description of the theory ==
Along with Zurek's related theory of envariance (invariance due to quantum entanglement), quantum Darwinism seeks to explain how the classical world emerges from the quantum world and proposes to answer the quantum measurement problem, the main interpretational challenge for quantum theory. The measurement problem arises because the quantum state vector, the source of all knowledge concerning quantum systems, evolves according to the Schrödinger equation into a linear superposition of different states, predicting paradoxical situations such as "Schrödinger's cat"; situations never experienced in our classical world. Quantum theory has traditionally treated this problem as being resolved by a non-unitary transformation of the state vector at the time of measurement into a definite state. It provides an extremely accurate means of predicting the value of the definite state that will be measured in the form of a probability for each possible measurement value. The physical nature of the transition from the quantum superposition of states to the definite classical state measured is not explained by the traditional theory but is usually assumed as an axiom and was at the basis of the debate between Niels Bohr and Albert Einstein concerning the completeness of quantum theory.

Quantum Darwinism seeks to explain the transition of quantum systems from the vast potentiality of superposed states to the greatly reduced set of pointer states as a selection process, einselection, imposed on the quantum system through its continuous interactions with the environment. All quantum interactions, including measurements, but much more typically interactions with the environment such as with the sea of photons in which all quantum systems are immersed, lead to decoherence or the manifestation of the quantum system in a particular basis dictated by the nature of the interaction in which the quantum system is involved. In the case of interactions with its environment Zurek and his collaborators have shown that a preferred basis into which a quantum system will decohere is the pointer basis underlying predictable classical states. It is in this sense that the pointer states of classical reality are selected from quantum reality and exist in the macroscopic realm in a state able to undergo further evolution. However, the 'einselection' program depends on assuming a particular division of the universal quantum state into 'system' + 'environment', with the different degrees of freedom of the environment posited as having mutually random phases. This phase randomness does not arise from within the quantum state of the universe on its own, and Ruth Kastner has pointed out that this limits the explanatory power of the Quantum Darwinism program. Zurek replies to Kastner's criticism in Classical selection and quantum Darwinism.

As a quantum system's interactions with its environment result in the recording of many redundant copies of information regarding its pointer states, this information is available to numerous observers able to achieve consensual agreement concerning their information of the quantum state. This aspect of einselection, called by Zurek 'Environment as a Witness', results in the potential for objective knowledge.
