= Dissipation model for extended environment =

Mathematical model

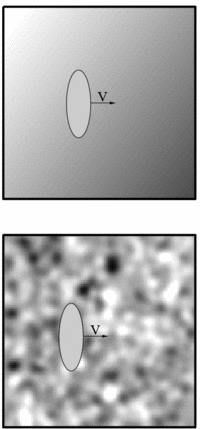
(a) The Brownian particle in the Caldeira-Leggett model experiences a fluctuating homogeneous field of force. (b) In case of the DLD model the fluctuating field is farther characterized by a finite correlation distance. The background image is a "snapshot" of the fluctuating environment. Namely, the gray levels correspond to the "height" of an instantaneous potential which is experienced by the Brownian particle.

A unified model for Diffusion Localization and Dissipation (DLD), optionally termed Diffusion with Local Dissipation, has been introduced for the study of Quantal Brownian Motion (QBM) in dynamical disorder. It can be regarded as a generalization of the familiar Caldeira-Leggett model.

$\mathcal{H} = \frac{p^2}{2m} + V(x) + \mathcal{H}_{int} + \mathcal{H}_{bath}$

$\mathcal{H}_{bath}=\sum_{\alpha}\left(\frac{P_{\alpha}^2}{2m_{\alpha}} +\frac{1}{2} m \omega_{\alpha}^2 Q_{\alpha}^2\right)$

$\mathcal{H}_{int} = - \sum_{\alpha} c_{\alpha} Q_{\alpha} u(x-x_{\alpha})$

where $Q_{\alpha}$ denotes the dynamical coordinate of the $\alpha$ scatterer or bath mode. $u(x-x_{\alpha})$ is the interaction potential, and $c_{\alpha}$ are coupling constants. The spectral characterization of the bath is analogous to that of the Caldeira-Leggett model:

$\frac{\pi}{2} \sum_{\alpha} \frac{c^2_{\alpha}}{m_{\alpha}\omega_{\alpha}} \delta(\omega-\omega_{\alpha}) \ \delta(x-x_{\alpha}) \ = \ J(\omega)$

i.e. the oscillators that appear in the Hamiltonian are distributed uniformly over space, and in each location have the same spectral distribution $J(\omega)$. Optionally the environment is characterized by the power spectrum of the fluctuations $\tilde{S}(q,\omega)$, which is determined by $J(\omega)$ and by the assumed interaction $u(r)$. See examples.

The model can be used to describes the dynamics of a Brownian particle in an Ohmic environment whose fluctuations are uncorrelated in space. This should be contrasted with the Zwanzig-Caldeira-Leggett model, where the induced fluctuating force is assumed to be uniform in space (see figure).

At high temperatures the propagator possesses a Markovian property and one can write down an equivalent Master equation. Unlike the case of the Zwanzig-Caldeira-Leggett model, genuine quantum mechanical effects manifest themselves due to the disordered nature of the environment.

Using the Wigner picture of the dynamics one can distinguish between two different mechanisms for destruction of coherence: scattering and smearing. The analysis of dephasing can be extended to the low temperature regime by using a semiclassical strategy. In this context the dephasing rate SP formula can be derived. Various results can be derived for ballistic, chaotic, diffusive, and both ergodic and non-ergodic motion.

== See also ==
- Quantum dissipation
- dephasing
- The dephasing rate SP formula
