= Quantum dissipation =

Dissipation in quantum systems

Quantum dissipation is the branch of physics that studies the quantum analogues of the process of irreversible loss of energy observed at the classical level. Its main purpose is to derive the laws of classical dissipation from the framework of quantum mechanics. It shares many features with the subjects of quantum decoherence and quantum theory of measurement.

== Models ==
The typical approach to describe dissipation is to split the total system in two parts: the quantum system where dissipation occurs, and a so-called environment or bath into which the energy of the former will flow. The way both systems are coupled depends on the details of the microscopic model, and hence, the description of the bath. To include an irreversible flow of energy (i.e., to avoid Poincaré recurrences in which the energy eventually flows back to the system), requires that the bath contain an infinite number of degrees of freedom. Notice that by virtue of the principle of universality, it is expected that the particular description of the bath will not affect the essential features of the dissipative process, as far as the model contains the minimal ingredients to provide the effect.

The simplest way to model the bath was proposed by Feynman and Vernon in a seminal paper from 1963. In this description the bath is a sum of an infinite number of harmonic oscillators, that in quantum mechanics represents a set of free bosonic particles.

=== Caldeira–Leggett model or harmonic bath model ===
In 1981, Amir Caldeira and Anthony J. Leggett proposed a simple model to study in detail the way dissipation arises from a quantum point of view. It describes a quantum particle in one dimension coupled to a bath. The Hamiltonian reads:

$$H=\frac{P^2}{2 M} + V(X) + \sum_i\left(\frac{p_i^2}{2 m_i}+\frac{1}{2}m_i \omega_i^2 q_i^2\right) - X \sum_i{C_i q_i} + X^2 \sum_i \frac{C_i^2}{2m_i \omega_i^2}$$,

The first two terms correspond to the Hamiltonian of a quantum particle of mass $M$ and momentum $P$, in a potential $V$ at position $X$. The third term describes the bath as an infinite sum of harmonic oscillators with masses $m_i$ and momentum $p_i$, at positions $q_i$. $\omega_i$ are the frequencies of the harmonic oscillators. The next term describes the way that the system and bath are coupled. In the Caldeira–Leggett model, the bath is coupled to the position of the particle. $C_i$ are coefficients which depend on the details of the coupling. The last term is a counter-term which must be included to ensure that dissipation is homogeneous in all space. As the bath couples to the position, if this term is not included the model is not translationally invariant, in the sense that the coupling is different wherever the quantum particle is located. This gives rise to an unphysical renormalization of the potential, which can be shown to be suppressed by employing real potentials.

To provide a good description of the dissipation mechanism, a relevant quantity is the bath spectral function, defined as follows:

$$J(\omega) =  \frac{\pi}{2} \sum_i \frac{C_i^2}{m_i \omega_i} \delta(\omega - \omega_i)$$

The bath spectral function provides a constraint in the choice of the coefficients $C_i$. When this function has the form $J(\omega) = \eta \omega$, the corresponding classical kind of dissipation can be shown to be Ohmic. A more generic form is $J(\omega) \propto \omega^s$. In this case, if $s > 1$ the dissipation is called "super-ohmic", while if $s < 1$ is sub-ohmic. An example of a super-ohmic bath is the electro-magnetic field under certain circumstances.

As mentioned, the main idea in the field of quantum dissipation is to explain the way classical dissipation can be described from a quantum mechanics point of view. To get the classical limit of the Caldeira–Leggett model, the bath must be integrated out (or traced out), which can be understood as taking the average over all the possible realizations of the bath and studying the effective dynamics of the quantum system. As a second step, the limit $\hbar \rightarrow 0$ must be taken to recover classical mechanics. To proceed with those technical steps mathematically, the path integral description of quantum mechanics is usually employed. The resulting classical equations of motion are:

$$M \frac{d^2}{dt^2} X(t) = - \frac{\partial V(X)}{\partial X} - \int_0^{T} d t' \alpha (t - t') (X(t) - X(t'))$$

where:

$$\alpha (t - t') = \frac{1}{2\pi} \int_0^{\infty} J(\omega) e^{-\omega|t-t'|} d \omega$$

is a kernel which characterizes the effective force that affects the motion of the particle in the presence of dissipation. For so-called Markovian baths, which do not keep memory of the interaction with the system, and for Ohmic dissipation, the equations of motion simplify to the classical equations of motion of a particle with friction:

$$M \frac{d^2}{dt^2} X(t) = - \frac{\partial V(X)}{\partial X} - \eta \frac{d X(t)}{d t}$$

Hence, one can see how Caldeira–Leggett model fulfills the goal of getting classical dissipation from the quantum mechanics framework. The Caldeira–Leggett model has been used to study quantum dissipation problems since its introduction in 1981, being extensively used as well in the field of quantum decoherence.

The Caldeira-Leggett model has also been extended to include time-dependent external fields, as for driven systems. In the presence of time-dependent external fields, if these act on the system only, but not on the bath, only the projected dynamics of the system is affected and it contains and additional external force term. Hence the total Hamiltonian of the system is given by:

$$H_{T} = H_{\rm S} + H_{\rm B} + H_{\rm SB} + H_{ext,\rm S}$$

where $H_{\rm S}$, $H_{\rm B}$ and $H_{\rm SB}$ are the Hamiltonians of the system, of the bath and their mutual coupling, respectively, while $H_{ext,S}$ denotes the external field contribution acting on the system only, but not on the bath. If, instead, the time-dependent external field acts on both the system and the bath (environment) as well, the total Hamiltonian is:

$$H_{T} = H_{\rm S} + H_{\rm B} + H_{\rm SB} + H_{ext,\rm SB}$$

where $H_{ext,SB}$ denotes the external field contribution acting on both the system and the bath. This situation has also been analyzed. It was shown that, in this situation, the form of the fluctuation-dissipation theorem gets modified with respect to the case where the bath is undriven. In particular, the fluctuation-dissipation relation has an extra term, which depends on the time-correlation of the external field. As a result, the dynamics is intrinsically non-Markovian even if the system and the bath are fully Markovian when the external field is switched off.

=== Dissipative two-level system ===
The dissipative two-level system is a particular realization of the Caldeira–Leggett model that deserves special attention due to its interest in the field of quantum computation. The aim of the model is to study the effects of dissipation in the dynamics of a particle that can hop between two different positions rather than a continuous degree of freedom. This reduced Hilbert space allows the problem to be described in terms of 1/2-spin operators. This is sometimes referred in the literature as the spin-boson model, and it is closely related to the Jaynes–Cummings model.

The Hamiltonian for the dissipative two-level system reads:

$H= \Delta \frac{\sigma_x}{2} + \sum_i\left(\frac{p_i^2}{2 m_i}+\frac{1}{2}m_i \omega_i^2 q_i^2\right) + \frac{\sigma_z}{2} \sum_i{C_i q_i}$,

where $\sigma_x$ and $\sigma_z$ are the Pauli matrices and $\Delta$ is the amplitude of hopping between the two possible positions. Notice that in this model the counter-term is no longer needed, as the coupling to $S_z$ gives already homogeneous dissipation.

The model has many applications. In quantum dissipation, it is used as a simple model to study the dynamics of a dissipative particle confined in a double-well potential. In the context of quantum computation, it represents a qubit coupled to an environment, which can produce decoherence. In the study of amorphous solids, it provides the basis of the standard theory to describe their thermodynamic properties.

The dissipative two-level system represents also a paradigm in the study of quantum phase transitions. For a critical value of the coupling to the bath it shows a phase transition from a regime in which the particle is delocalized among the two positions to another in which it is localized in only one of them. The transition is of Kosterlitz–Thouless kind, as can be seen by deriving the renormalization group flow equations for the hopping term.

=== Energy dissipation in Hamiltonian formalism ===
A different approach to describe energy dissipation is to consider time dependent Hamiltonians. Against a common misunderstanding, the resulting unitary dynamics can describe energy dissipation, as certain degrees of freedom loose energy and others gain energy. However, the quantum mechanical state of the system stays pure, thus such an approach can not describe dephasing unless a subsystem is chosen and the reduced density matrix of this open quantum system is analyzed. Dephasing leads to quantum decoherence or information dissipation and is often important when describing open quantum systems. However, this approach is typically used e.g. in the description of optical experiments. There a light pulse (described by a time dependent semi-classical Hamiltonian) can change the energy in the system by stimulated absorption or emission.

== See also ==
- Dissipation model for extended environment
- Jaynes–Cummings model
- Open quantum system
- Lindblad equation
- Quantum decoherence
- Dephasing

== Sources ==
- U. Weiss, Quantum Dissipative Systems (1992), World Scientific.
- Leggett, A. J.; Chakravarty, S.; Dorsey, A. T.; Fisher, Matthew P. A.; Garg, Anupam; Zwerger, W. (1 December 1986). "Dynamics of the dissipative two-state system". Reviews of Modern Physics. 59 (1). American Physical Society (APS): 1–85. doi:10.1103/revmodphys.59.1. hdl:2142/94708. ISSN 0034-6861.
- P. Hänggi and G.L. Ingold, Fundamental Aspects of quantum Brownian motion, Chaos, vol. 15, ARTN 026105 (2005); http://www.physik.uni-augsburg.de/theo1/hanggi/Papers/378.pdf
