= Dynamical decoupling =

Control technique for improving qubit coherence in quantum computing

Dynamical decoupling (DD) is an open-loop quantum control technique employed in quantum computing to suppress decoherence by taking advantage of rapid, time-dependent control modulation. In its simplest form, DD is implemented by periodic sequences of instantaneous control pulses, whose net effect is to approximately average the unwanted system-environment coupling to zero. Different schemes exist for designing DD protocols that use realistic bounded-strength control pulses, as well as for achieving high-order error suppression, and for making DD compatible with quantum gates. Commonly used protocols range from the basic Carr-Purcell-Meiboom-Gill (CPMG) sequence to more advanced, non-periodic sequences like Uhrig Dynamical Decoupling (UDD) and recursive, high-order schemes like Concatenated Dynamical Decoupling (CDD). They are based on the Hahn spin echo technique of applying periodic pulses to enable refocusing and hence extend the coherence times of qubits.

Periodic repetition of suitable high-order DD sequences may be employed to engineer a 'stroboscopic saturation' of qubit coherence, or coherence plateau, that can persist in the presence of realistic noise spectra and experimental control imperfections. This permits device-independent, high-fidelity data storage for computationally useful periods with bounded error probability.

Dynamical decoupling has also been studied in a classical context for two coupled pendulums whose oscillation frequencies are modulated in time.

== The Basic Principle: The Hahn Spin Echo ==
The foundation of most dynamical decoupling sequences is the Hahn spin echo, first discovered in 1950 by Erwin Hahn. The technique was originally developed in the context of nuclear magnetic resonance (NMR), but its principle is general. It is designed to reverse the effects of dephasing caused by slow or static inhomogeneities in the environment.

The process for a single qubit (or spin-1/2 particle) is as follows:

1. A qubit, initially in a superposition state, is allowed to evolve for a time τ. During this period, different parts of the quantum ensemble or different qubits in an array precess at slightly different rates due to local, quasi-static environmental noise. This causes them to lose phase coherence with each other. This is known as free induction decay.
2. At time τ, a short and strong control pulse is applied, which effectively rotates the qubit state by 180° (a π-pulse) around an axis in the equatorial plane of the Bloch sphere.
3. The qubit is then allowed to evolve for another period of time τ.

The crucial effect of the π-pulse is that it inverts the accumulated phase. The qubits that were precessing faster and had accumulated more phase now precess "backwards" relative to the slower ones. After the second evolution period of τ, the slower and faster components realign perfectly, leading to a recovery of the quantum coherence in the form of an "echo."

A common analogy is that of a group of runners on a track. They all start at the same line but run at slightly different speeds. After a time τ, they have spread out along the track. If the starter instructs all of them to instantly turn around and run back towards the start at their same individual speeds, the fastest runner, who is furthest away, will also cover the most ground on the return trip. All runners will cross the starting line at the exact same moment, at time 2τ, perfectly regrouped. The π-pulse is the "turn around" command.

The Hahn echo is effective at cancelling noise that is constant or varies very slowly on the timescale of 2τ. However, it is ineffective against noise that fluctuates on a faster timescale.

== Common Dynamical Decoupling Sequences ==
To combat more general, time-varying noise, the Hahn echo concept is extended into sequences of multiple pulses. These sequences are designed to create a more frequent and robust "refocusing" of the qubit's state, effectively filtering out a wider band of noise frequencies.

=== Carr-Purcell-Meiboom-Gill (CPMG) Sequence ===
One of the most widely used and robust periodic sequences is the Carr-Purcell-Meiboom-Gill (CPMG) sequence. It is an improvement on the original Carr-Purcell (CP) sequence that makes it resilient to pulse errors. The sequence consists of a train of equally spaced π-pulses:

Free evolution (τ/2) - (π-pulse) - Free evolution (τ) - (π-pulse) - ... - Free evolution (τ) - (π-pulse) - Free evolution (τ/2)

The key innovation of Meiboom and Gill was to apply the π-pulses along an axis perpendicular to the initial qubit state in the Bloch sphere's equatorial plane. For example, if the qubit state begins along the x-axis, the π-pulses are applied around the y-axis. This change has the critical effect of compensating for small pulse rotation errors. If a pulse slightly over-rotates the qubit, the next pulse in the sequence will have an opposite over-rotation effect, canceling the error to first order. This robustness makes CPMG a workhorse protocol in many quantum computing and sensing experiments, particularly in NMR, trapped ions, and NV centers.

=== Uhrig Dynamical Decoupling (UDD) ===
Unlike periodic sequences, Uhrig Dynamical Decoupling (UDD) uses non-uniformly spaced π-pulses. The timing of the j-th pulse in a sequence of n pulses applied over a total time T is given by $\delta_j = T \sin^2\left(\frac{\pi j}{2n+2}\right)$.

This specific timing is mathematically optimized to provide a high-order suppression of general dephasing noise, particularly for environments where the noise power spectrum has a sharp cutoff at high frequencies. For such noise spectra, UDD can achieve a higher fidelity with fewer pulses than periodic sequences like CPMG. It is a powerful example of how optimized, non-intuitive pulse timings can provide superior performance.

=== Concatenated Dynamical Decoupling (CDD) ===
Concatenated Dynamical Decoupling provides a recursive method for constructing sequences that can, in theory, cancel noise to an arbitrarily high order.The design is hierarchical:

- A first-level CDD sequence (CDD-1) is simply the Hahn spin echo.
- A second-level sequence (CDD-2) is created by taking the base CDD-1 sequence and replacing each period of free evolution with the entire CDD-1 sequence itself.

This recursive construction systematically eliminates progressively higher-order terms in the Magnus expansion which describes the effective noise Hamiltonian. While powerful in theory, the number of required pulses grows exponentially with the concatenation level, making higher-order CDD sequences challenging to implement in practice due to pulse imperfections and timing constraints.

=== Other Advanced Sequences ===
The field of dynamical decoupling is rich with other sequences designed to be robust against different types of errors. For example, the XY family of sequences (e.g., XY-4, XY-8, XY-16) uses pulses applied along different axes (X, Y, -X, -Y) to simultaneously compensate for both dephasing noise and certain types of pulse errors, such as amplitude and off-axis errors. More advanced protocols like Knill Dynamical Decoupling (KDD) offer even greater robustness at the cost of increased complexity.

== Theoretical Foundation ==
The effectiveness of dynamical decoupling is formally described using Average Hamiltonian Theory (AHT). The goal of AHT is to describe the net evolution of a system under a rapid, periodic control sequence with a single, time-independent effective Hamiltonian (H_{eff}). A successful DD sequence is one that makes this effective Hamiltonian, and thus the error it describes, vanish to the highest possible order.

The analysis begins with the total Hamiltonian of a qubit coupled to an environment:

$$H_\text{total}(t) = H_\text{sys} + H_\text{ctrl}(t) + H_\text{err}$$

where H_{ctrl}(t) represents the DD pulses and H_{err} is the noise to be suppressed.

The analysis proceeds by moving into an interaction picture defined by the control pulses, often called the toggling frame. In this frame, the error Hamiltonian is modulated by the control pulses:

$$\tilde{H}_\text{err}(t) = U_c^\dagger(t) H_\text{err} U_c(t)$$

where $U_c(t) = \mathcal{T} \exp \left( -i \int_0^t H_\text{ctrl}(t') dt' \right)$ (with ħ=1).

The effect of the pulses is to transform the error. For example, a perfect π-pulse around the x-axis transforms the dephasing error operator σ_{z} into −σ_{z}. This "sign-flipping" is the mechanism by which the error can be averaged away.

The total evolution over one DD cycle of period T is difficult to calculate directly. The Magnus expansion is a tool that expresses this evolution in terms of the desired effective Hamiltonian:

$$U_\text{err}(T) = \mathcal{T} \exp \left( -i \int_0^T \tilde{H}_\text{err}(t') dt' \right) = \exp(-i H_\text{eff} T)$$

where H_{eff} can be written as a series H_{eff} = H^{(0)} + H^{(1)} + H^{(2)} + … . The first two terms are:

- Zeroth-order term (the average Hamiltonian):

$$H^{(0)} = \frac{1}{T} \int_0^T \tilde{H}_\text{err}(t) dt$$

- First-order term:

$$H^{(1)} = \frac{-i}{2T} \int_0^T dt_2 \int_0^{t_2} dt_1 [\tilde{H}_\text{err}(t_2), \tilde{H}_\text{err}(t_1)]$$

The design goal of a DD sequence is to make these terms vanish. A sequence that makes H^{(0)} = 0 is considered a first-order decoupling sequence. Higher-order sequences like UDD or CDD are designed to make both H^{(0)} and H^{(1)} (and sometimes higher terms) simultaneously zero, offering better protection against noise.

== Applications and Extensions ==
Beyond quantum memory, dynamical decoupling has several important applications:

- Dynamically Corrected Gates: To protect a qubit during active computation, DD sequences can be interleaved within the execution of a quantum gate. For example, a π-pulse can be inserted in the middle of a long two-qubit gate to refocus noise that occurs during the operation. This technique is essential for achieving high-fidelity gates in noisy systems.
- Quantum Sensing and Noise Spectroscopy: DD sequences can be repurposed as a tool to probe the noise environment of a qubit. The sequence of pulses acts as a frequency filter. The coherence of a qubit under a CPMG sequence with inter-pulse delay τ is most sensitive to environmental noise at frequencies near 1/(2τ). By varying τ and measuring the resulting qubit coherence, one can map out the frequency spectrum of the noise affecting the qubit, a technique known as noise spectroscopy.
