= Dephasing rate SP formula =

Formula in condensed matter physics

The SP formula for the dephasing rate $\Gamma_{\varphi}$ of a particle that moves in a fluctuating environment unifies various results that have been obtained, notably in condensed matter physics, with regard to the motion of electrons in a metal. The general case requires taking into account not only the temporal correlations but also the spatial correlations of the environmental fluctuations. These can be characterized by the spectral form factor $\tilde{S}(q,\omega)$, while the motion of the particle is characterized by its power spectrum $\tilde{P}(q,\omega)$. Consequently, at finite temperature the expression for the dephasing rate takes the following form that involves S and P functions:

$\Gamma_{\varphi} \ = \ \int d{q} \int \frac{d\omega}{2\pi} \,\tilde{S}({q},\omega) \, \tilde{P}(-{q},-\omega)$

Due to inherent limitations of the semiclassical (stationary phase) approximation, the physically correct procedure is to use the non-symmetrized quantum versions of $\tilde{S}(q,\omega)$ and $\tilde{P}(q,\omega)$. The argument is based on the analogy of the above expression with the Fermi-golden-rule calculation of the transitions that are induced by the system-environment interaction.

== Derivation ==
It is most illuminating to understand the SP formula in the context of the DLD model, which describes motion in dynamical disorder. In order to derive the dephasing rate formula from first principles, a purity-based definition of the dephasing factor can be adopted. The purity $P(t)=e^{-F(t)}$ describes how a quantum state becomes mixed due to the entanglement of the system with the environment. Using perturbation theory, one recovers at finite temperatures at the long time limit $F(t)=\Gamma_{\varphi}t$, where the decay constant is given by the dephasing rate formula with non symmetrized spectral functions as expected. There is a somewhat controversial possibility to get power law decay of $P(t)$ at the limit of zero temperature. The proper way to incorporate Pauli blocking in the many-body dephasing calculation, within the framework of the SP formula approach, has been clarified as well.

== Example ==
For the standard 1D Caldeira-Leggett Ohmic environment, with temperature $T$ and friction $\eta$, the spectral form factor is

$$\tilde{S}(q,\omega) \ = \ \frac{(2\pi)\delta(q)}{q^2} \, \left[\frac{2\eta\omega}{1-e^{-\omega/T}}\right]$$

This expression reflects that in the classical limit the electron experiences "white temporal noise", which means force that is not correlated in time, but uniform in space (high $q$ components are absent). In contrast to that, for diffusive motion of an electron in a 3D metallic environment, which is created by the rest of the electrons, the spectral form factor is

$$\tilde{S}(q,\omega) \ = \
\frac{1}{\nu Dq^2}
\left[\frac{2\omega}{1-e^{-\omega/T}}\right].$$

This expression reflects that in the classical limit the electron experiences "white spatio-temporal noise", which means force that is neither correlated in time nor in space. The power spectrum of a single diffusive electron is

$$\tilde{P}(q,\omega) \ \ = \ \ \frac{2Dq^2}{\omega^2+(Dq^2)^2}$$

But in the many body context this expression acquires a "Fermi blocking factor":

$$\tilde{P}(q,\omega) \ \ = \ \
\frac{d}{d\omega} \left[\frac{\omega}{1-e^{-\omega/T}}\right]
\times \frac{2Dq^2}{\omega^2+(Dq^2)^2}$$

Calculating the SP integral we get the well known result $\Gamma_{\varphi} \propto T^{3/2}$.
