= Roland Omnès =

French author

- Born: Roland Omnès; 18 February 1931; Clichy, Hauts-de-Seine, France
- Died: 2 August 2022 (aged 91); Saint-Rémy-lès-Chevreuse, France
- Known for: Consistent histories
- Scientific career
- Fields: Theoretical physics Quantum mechanics
- Institutions: Université Paris-Sud XI

Roland Omnès (18 February 1931 – 2 August 2022) was a French physicist and author of several books that aimed to give non-scientists the information required to understand quantum mechanics.

== Biography ==
Omnès was Professor Emeritus of Theoretical Physics in the Faculté des Sciences at Orsay, at the Université Paris-Sud XI. He was instrumental in developing consistent histories and quantum decoherence approaches in quantum mechanics. He received the Paul-Langevin Prize in 1959.

Omnès died in Saint-Rémy-lès-Chevreuse on 2 August 2022, at the age of 91.

== Philosophical work ==
In his philosophical work (especially in Quantum Philosophy), Omnès argues that:

1. "Until modern times, intuitive, rational thought was sufficient to describe the world; mathematics remained an adjunct, simply helping to make our intuitive descriptions more precise."
2. "In the late 19th and early 20th centuries, we arrived at a Fracture between common sense and our best descriptions of reality. Our formal description became the truest picture (most consistent with how things are, experimentally) and common sense was left behind. Our best descriptions of reality are now incomprehensible to common sense alone, and our intuitions about how things are often negated by experiment and theory."
3. "However it is, finally, possible to recover common sense from our formal, mathematical description of reality. We can now demonstrate that the laws of classical logic, classical probability, and classical dynamics (of common sense, in fact) apply at the macroscopic level, even in a world described by a single, unitary wavefunction. This follows from the fundamental principles of quantum mechanics, with no need for extra logical constructs such as wave function collapse."

"We will never", Omnès believed, "find a common sense interpretation of quantum law itself. Nevertheless, it is now possible to see that common sense and quantum reality are compatible with each other: we can enter the world at either starting point, and we will find that each leads to the other: experiment leads to theory, and the theory can now recover the common sense framework in which the experiment was conducted (and in which our lives are lived)."

== The new 'Copenhagen Interpretation'? ==
Omnès's work is sometimes described as an update to the Copenhagen interpretation of quantum mechanics. This is somewhat misleading. The relationship between the two accounts is as follows:

The Copenhagen interpretation of quantum mechanics (argued for most centrally by Niels Bohr) advises that physicists "shut up and calculate". It holds that some questions are unanswerable, and that there are inexplicable rules that reconcile the quantum description of reality (which is experimentally correct to at least 10 decimal places of accuracy) with human-observed reality (which seems self-evidently correct, and yet is apparently in contradiction with quantum law).

Omnès claimed that there is a self-consistent framework that enables recovering the principles of classical common sense—and knowing, precisely, their limits—starting from fundamental quantum law.

== Bibliography ==
The work Omnès presents in his books was developed by Omnès himself, Robert B. Griffiths, Murray Gell-Mann, James Hartle, and others.

=== Non-fiction ===
- Omnès, Roland; Froissart, Marcel (1963). Mandelstam Theory and Regge Poles: An Introduction for Experimentalists. W.A. Benjamin.
- Omnès, Roland (1971). Introduction to particle physics. London: Wiley-Interscience. ISBN 978-0-471-65372-1.
- Omnès, Roland (1973). L'univers et ses métamorphoses (in French). Marabout. ISBN 978-2-7056-5746-8.
- The Interpretation of Quantum Mechanics (Princeton University Press, 1994) – a technical exposition of Omnès's account, for physicists.
- Understanding Quantum Mechanics (Princeton University Press, 1999) – a somewhat less technical revision and updating of the above work, also intended for physicists.
- Quantum Philosophy: Understanding and Interpreting Contemporary Science (English Edition – Princeton University Press, 1999); (French Edition - Gallimard, 1994)
- Omnès, Roland (2002). Alors l'un devint deux: la question du réalisme en physique et en philosophie des mathématiques (in French). Flammarion. ISBN 978-2-08-210034-2.
- Converging Realities: Toward a Common Philosophy of Physics and Mathematics (Princeton University Press, 2004) – Here Omnès presents, in detail, his position on the relationship between mathematics and reality which he started to develop in Quantum Philosophy.
- Charpak, Georges; Omnès, Roland (2004). Soyez savants, devenez prophètes (in French). Odile Jacob. ISBN 978-2-7381-9055-0.
- Omnès, Roland (2006). Les indispensables de la mécanique quantique. Sciences (in French). Paris: O. Jacob. ISBN 978-2-7381-1820-2.
- Omnès, Roland (2008). La Révélation des Lois de la nature (in French). Odile Jacob. ISBN 978-2-7381-2025-0.

=== Fiction ===
- Omnès, Roland (2000). L'espion d'ici (in French). Flammarion. ISBN 978-2-08-212538-3.
