= Christopher Isham =

British theoretical physicist

Christopher John Isham
- Born: 28 April 1944 (age 82)
- Education: Imperial College London (PhD, 1969)
- Known for: Research in Quantum gravity
- Awards: IOP Dirac Medal (2011)
- Scientific career
- Fields: Quantum gravity Quantum theory foundations
- Workplaces: Imperial College London
- Doctoral advisor: Paul Taunton Matthews
- Other academic advisors: Abdus Salam

Christopher John Isham (/ˈaɪʃəm/; born 28 April 1944), usually cited as Chris J. Isham, is a theoretical physicist at Imperial College London.

== Research ==
Isham's main research interests are quantum gravity and foundational studies in quantum theory. He was the inventor of an approach to temporal quantum logic called the HPO formalism, and has worked on loop quantum gravity and quantum geometrodynamics. Together with other physicists, such as John C. Baez, Isham is known as a proponent of the utility of category theory in theoretical physics. In recent years, since at least 1997, he has been working on a new approach to quantum theory based on topos theory.

He is the author of Modern differential geometry for physicists, first published in 1989.

Isham has appeared in several NOVA television programmes as well as a film about Stephen Hawking. Physicist Paul Davies has described Isham as "Britain's greatest quantum gravity expert". As a practising Christian, Isham has also written about the relationships among philosophy, theology, and physics.

== Awards ==
- 2011: Dirac Medal of the Institute of Physics for his works on quantum gravity.

== Bibliography ==
- Isham, C. J., Physics, Philosophy, and Theology, 1988
- Isham (1989), Modern Differential Geometry for Physicists; 2nd edn in 1999.
- Christopher Isham, "Quantum Theories of the Creation of the Universe," in R. Russell, N. Murphy and C. J. Isham (eds.), Quantum Cosmology and the Laws of Nature (Vatican City: Vatican Press, 1993), p. 74.
- Christopher Isham, "Creation of the Universe as a Quantum Tunnelling Process," in (eds. R. J. Russell et al.), Physics, Philosophy and Theology (Vatican City: Vatican Press, 1988), pp. 375–408.
- Isham, C. J. (1993), "Canonical Quantum Gravity and the Problem of Time", in L. A. Ibort and M. A. Rodríguez (eds.), Integrable Systems, Quantum Groups, and Quantum Field theories. Dordrecht: Kluwer Academic Publishers, 157-288.
- Isham, C. J., K. V. Kuchař, "Representations Of Space-Time Diffeomorphisms. 2. Canonical Geometrodynamics," Annals of Physics 164:316 (1985).
- Isham, C. J. (1994), Prima facie questions in quantum gravity, in Ehlers and Friedrich 25 (1994), 1-21.
- Isham, C. J. (1997), "Structural Issues in Quantum Gravity", in M. Francaviglia et al. (eds.), Florence 1995, General Relativity and Gravitation, World Scientific.
- Butterfield, Jeremy, and Chris Isham (1999), "On the Emergence of Time in Quantum Gravity", in Butterfield (1999), 111-168.
- Butterfield, Jeremy, and Christopher Isham (2001), "Spacetime and the Philosophical Challenge of Quantum Gravity", in Craig Callender and Nick Huggett (eds.) (2001), 33-89.
- Döring, Andreas and Isham, Chris, "What is a Thing?: Topos Theory in the Foundations of Physics", in Bob Coecke, New Structures in Physics, Chapter 13, pp. 753–940, Lecture Notes in Physics, 813, Springer, 2011, ISBN 978-3-642-12820-2, (also see arXiv:0803.0417v1)

== See also ==
- List of quantum gravity researchers
- List of Christian thinkers in science
