= Wojciech H. Zurek =

Polish theoretical physicist (born 1951)

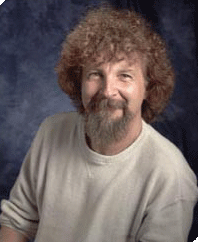
- Born: Wojciech Hubert Żurek; 1951 (age 74–75); Bielsko-Biała, Poland
- Education: AGH University of Science and Technology, Kraków (M.Sc., 1974); University of Texas at Austin (PhD, 1979)
- Known for: Quantum decoherence No-cloning theorem Quantum Darwinism; Pointer state Einselection; Envariance; Quantum discord Kibble–Zurek mechanism Kibble–Zurek scaling laws
- Scientific career
- Fields: Quantum physics
- Workplaces: California Institute of Technology; Los Alamos National Laboratory; Santa Fe Institute; University of California, Santa Barbara
- Doctoral advisor: William C. Schieve

Wojciech Hubert Zurek (Polish: Żurek; born 1951) is a Polish and American theoretical physicist and a leading authority on quantum theory, especially decoherence and non-equilibrium dynamics of symmetry breaking and resulting defect generation (known as the Kibble–Zurek mechanism).

== Education ==
He attended the I Liceum Ogólnokształcące im. Mikołaja Kopernika (1st Secondary High School of Mikołaj Kopernik) in Bielsko-Biała.

Zurek earned his M.Sc. in physics at AGH University of Science and Technology, Kraków, Poland in 1974 and completed his Ph.D. under advisor William C. Schieve at the University of Texas at Austin in 1979.

== Career ==
Zurek spent two years at Caltech as a Tolman Fellow, and started at the Los Alamos National Laboratory LANL as a J. Oppenheimer Fellow.

He was the leader of the Theoretical Astrophysics Group at Los Alamos from 1991 until he was made a laboratory fellow (a prestigious distinction for a US National Laboratory scientist) in the theory division in 1996. Zurek is currently a foreign associate of the Cosmology Program at the Canadian Institute for Advanced Research. He served as a member of the external faculty of the Santa Fe Institute, and has been a visiting professor at the University of California, Santa Barbara. Zurek co-organized the programs Quantum Coherence and Decoherence and Quantum Computing and Chaos at UCSB's Institute for Theoretical Physics.

== Work ==
He researches decoherence, physics of quantum and classical information, non-equilibrium dynamics of defect generation, and astrophysics. He is also the co-author, along with William Wootters and Dennis Dieks, of a proof stating that a single quantum cannot be cloned (see the no-cloning theorem). He also coined the terms einselection and quantum discord.

Zurek with his colleague Tom W. B. Kibble pioneered a paradigmatic framework for understanding defect generation in non-equilibrium processes, particularly, for understanding topological defects generated when a second-order phase transition point is crossed at a finite rate. The paradigm covers phenomena of enormous varieties and scales, ranging from structure formation in the early Universe to vortex generation in superfluids. The key mechanism of critical defect generation is known as the Kibble–Zurek mechanism, and the resulting scaling laws known as the Kibble–Zurek scaling laws.

He pointed out the fundamental role of environment in determining a set of special basis states immune to environmental decoherence (pointer basis) which defines a classical measuring apparatus unambiguously. His work on decoherence paves a way towards the understanding of emergence of the classical world from the quantum mechanical one, getting rid of ad hoc demarcations between the two, like the one imposed by Niels Bohr in the famous Copenhagen interpretation of quantum mechanics. The underlying mechanism proposed and developed by Zurek and his collaborators is known as quantum Darwinism. His work also has a lot of potential benefit to the emerging field of quantum computing.

He is a pioneer in information physics, edited an influential book on "Complexity, Entropy and the Physics of Information", and spearheaded the efforts that finally exorcised Maxwell's demon. Zurek showed that the demon can extract energy from its environment for "free" as long as it (a) is able to find structure in the environment, and (b) is able to compress this pattern (whereas the remaining code is more succinct than the brute-force description of the structure). In this way the demon can exploit thermal fluctuations. However, he showed that in thermodynamic equilibrium (the most likely state of the environment), the demon can at best break even, even if the information about the environment is compressed. As a result of his exploration, Zurek suggested redefining entropy and distinguishing between two parts: the part that we already know about the environment (measured in Kolmogorov complexity), and, conditioned on our knowledge, the remaining uncertainty (measured in Shannon entropy).

== Honors ==
- 1996 Laboratory Fellow at the Los Alamos National Laboratory
- 2004 Phi Beta Kappa Visiting Lecturer
- 2005 Alexander von Humboldt Prize
- 2009 Fellow of the American Physical Society
- 2009 Marian Smoluchowski Medal, highest prize of the Polish Physical Society
- 2010 Albert-Einstein Professorship, honorary professorship at the University of Ulm
- 2012 Order of Polonia Restituta, the Commander's Cross - one of Poland's highest Orders
- 2014 Los Alamos Medal, the highest honor bestowed by the Los Alamos National Laboratory
- 2019 Doctor Honoris Causa, Jagiellonian University, Krakow
- 2021 Doctor Honoris Causa, University of Science and Technology (AGH), Krakow
- 2024 National Academy of Sciences, USA

== Books ==
- as editor with John Wheeler: Quantum theory of measurement. Princeton University Press 1983 ISBN 978-0691613161; 2014 edition
- as editor with A. van der Merwe, W. A. Miller: Between Quantum and Cosmos. Princeton University Press, 1988 ISBN 978-0691605548
- as editor: Complexity, Entropy and Physics of Information. Addison-Wesley 1990; Zurek, Wojciech H. (8 March 2018). 2018 pbk edition. CRC Press. ISBN 978-0-201-51506-0.
- as editor with J. J. Halliwell, J. Pérez-Mercader: Physical Origins of Time Asymmetry. Cambridge Univ. Press, Cambridge, 1994 ISBN 0-521-43328-2 1996 pbk edition. Cambridge University Press. 21 March 1996. ISBN 0-521-56837-4.
- as editor with H. Arodz and J. Dziarmaga: Patterns of Symmetry Breaking, NATO ASI series volume (Kluwer Academic, Dordrecht, 2003) ISBN 978-1-4020-1745-2; 2012 edition. Springer. 6 December 2012. ISBN 9789400710290. e-book ISBN 978-94-007-1029-0
- Zurek, Wojciech Hubert (2025). Decoherence and Quantum Darwinism: From Quantum Foundations to Classical Reality. Cambridge: Cambridge University Press.
