= Einselection =

Process in quantum mechanics

In quantum mechanics, einselections, short for "environment-induced superselection", is a name coined by Wojciech H. Zurek for a process which is claimed to explain the appearance of wavefunction collapse and the emergence of classical descriptions of reality from quantum descriptions. In this approach, classicality is described as an emergent property induced in open quantum systems by their environments. Due to the interaction with the environment, the vast majority of states in the Hilbert space of a quantum open system become highly unstable due to entangling interaction with the environment, which in effect monitors selected observables of the system. After a decoherence time, which for macroscopic objects is typically many orders of magnitude shorter than any other dynamical timescale, a generic quantum state decays into an uncertain state which can be expressed as a mixture of simple pointer states. In this way the environment induces effective superselection rules. Thus, einselection precludes stable existence of pure superpositions of pointer states. These 'pointer states' are stable despite environmental interaction. The einselected states lack coherence, and therefore do not exhibit the quantum behaviours of entanglement and superposition.

Advocates of this approach argue that since only quasi-local, essentially classical states survive the decoherence process, einselection can in many ways explain the emergence of a (seemingly) classical reality in a fundamentally quantum universe (at least to local observers). However, the basic program has been criticized as relying on a circular argument (e.g. by Ruth Kastner). So the question of whether the 'einselection' account can really explain the phenomenon of wave function collapse remains unsettled.

== Definition ==
Zurek has defined einselection as follows: "Decoherence leads to einselection when the states of the environment $|\epsilon_i \rangle$ corresponding to different pointer states become orthogonal: $\langle \epsilon_i|\epsilon_j \rangle = \delta_{ij}$",

== Details ==
Einselected pointer states are distinguished by their ability to persist in spite of the environmental monitoring and therefore are the ones in which quantum open systems are observed. Understanding the nature of these states and the process of their dynamical selection is of fundamental importance. This process has been studied first in a measurement situation: When the system is an apparatus whose intrinsic dynamics can be neglected, pointer states turn out to be eigenstates of the interaction Hamiltonian between the apparatus and its environment. In more general situations, when the system's dynamics is relevant, einselection is more complicated. Pointer states result from the interplay between self-evolution and environmental monitoring.

To study einselection, an operational definition of pointer states has been introduced. This is the "predictability sieve" criterion, based on an intuitive idea: Pointer states can be defined as the ones which become minimally entangled with the environment in the course of their evolution. The predictability sieve criterion is a way to quantify this idea by using the following algorithmic procedure: For every initial pure state $|\psi\rangle$, one measures the entanglement generated dynamically between the system and the environment by computing the entropy:

$$\mathcal {H}_\Psi (t)= -\operatorname{Tr} \left ( \rho_\Psi(t) \log \rho_\Psi(t) \right )$$

or some other measure of predictability from the reduced density matrix of the system $\rho_\Psi \left ( t \right )$ (which is initially $\rho_\Psi(0)=|\Psi\rangle\langle\Psi|$). The entropy is a function of time and a functional of the initial state $\left | \Psi \right \rangle$. Pointer states are obtained by minimizing $\mathcal {H}_\Psi\,$ over $\left | \Psi \right \rangle$ and demanding that the answer be robust when varying the time $t\$.

The nature of pointer states has been investigated using the predictability sieve criterion only for a limited number of examples. Apart from the already mentioned case of the measurement situation (where pointer states are simply eigenstates of the interaction Hamiltonian) the most notable example is that of a quantum Brownian particle coupled through its position with a bath of independent harmonic oscillators. In such case pointer states are localized in phase space, even though the interaction Hamiltonian involves the position of the particle. Pointer states are the result of the interplay between self-evolution and interaction with the environment and turn out to be coherent states.

There is also a quantum limit of decoherence: When the spacing between energy levels of the system is large compared to the frequencies present in the environment, energy eigenstates are einselected nearly independently of the nature of the system-environment coupling.

== Collisional decoherence ==
There has been significant work on correctly identifying the pointer states in the case of a massive particle decohered by collisions with a fluid environment, often known as collisional decoherence. In particular, Busse and Hornberger have identified certain solitonic wavepackets as being unusually stable in the presence of such decoherence.

== See also ==
- Mott problem
