= Robert Griffiths (physicist) =

American physicist (born 1937)

Robert B. Griffiths
- Born: Robert B. Griffiths; 25 February 1937 (age 89); Etah, United Provinces of British India
- Citizenship: United States
- Education: Princeton University (B.A.); Stanford University (M.S., Ph.D.)
- Known for: Consistent histories; Griffiths inequality
- Awards: US Senior Scientist Award by the Alexander von Humboldt Foundation (1973); A. Cressy Morrison Award by New York Academy of Sciences (1981); Dannie Heineman Prize for Mathematical Physics (1984)
- Scientific career
- Fields: Theoretical physics; Quantum mechanics
- Workplaces: Carnegie Mellon University; University of California, San Diego

Robert Budington Griffiths (February 25, 1937) is an American physicist at Carnegie Mellon University. He is the originator of the consistent histories approach to quantum mechanics, which has since been developed by himself, Roland Omnès, Murray Gell-Mann, and James Hartle.
