= Pointer state =

Quantum states less perturbed by decoherence than others

In quantum Darwinism and similar theories, pointer states are quantum states, sometimes of a measuring apparatus, if present, that are less perturbed by decoherence than other states, and are the quantum equivalents of the classical states of the system after decoherence has occurred through interaction with the environment. 'Pointer' refers to the reading of a recording or measuring device, which in old analog versions would often have a gauge or pointer display.

== See also ==
- Einselection
- Mott problem
