= Dephasing =

Mechanism recovering classical behavior from a quantum system

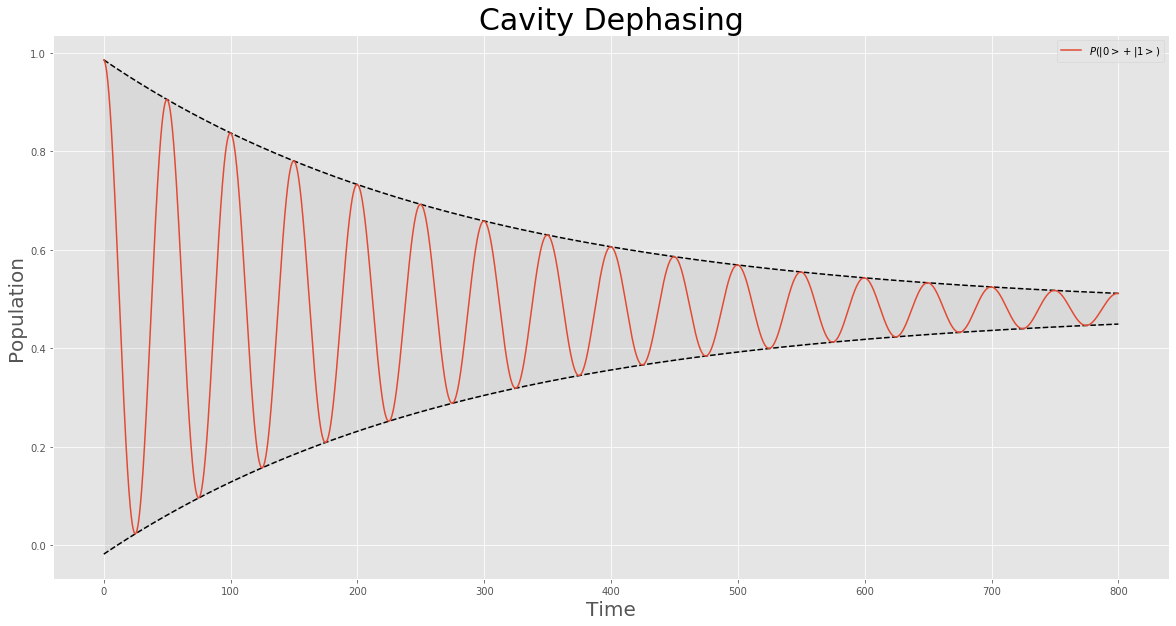
Cavity loses coherence due to dephasing.

In physics, dephasing or phase damping is a loss of phase coherence between different states of a quantum system. It is a type of decoherence, and can contribute to loss of information in the system, even if no energy is exchanged.

In a quantum superposition, states have a relative phase responsible for interference effects. The phase relationship between different states stores information about the system. Dephasing can happen when a system becomes correlated to an external environment, instead of the system of interest. If a system has experienced significant dephasing, it ceases to behave like a coherent superposition with probabilities determined by quantum mechanics, and instead behaves like a classical probabilistic mixture of states. In this sense, decoherence recovers classical behaviour from a quantum system.

Dephasing is an important effect in molecular and atomic spectroscopy, in nuclear and magnetic resonance (NMR), in the condensed matter physics of mesoscopic devices, and in quantum information, specifically open quantum systems. In imaging and spectroscopy techniques such as MRI and NMR, dephasing can lead to decreased signal strength or image intensity. In quantum information, dephasing in a quantum processor can cause noise and loss of information, making quantum computation unreliable.

== Background ==
Decoherence theory was developed in the 1970s and 1980s to attempt to explain why macroscopic elements behaved classically within the framework of quantum mechanics. This necessitated a theory of open quantum systems, which refer to systems that interact with the environment (as opposed to closed systems, which do not). In open quantum systems, the system interacts with the environment and it inevitably couples to its environment, causing decoherence.

The coherence of a sample is explained by the off-diagonal elements of a density matrix. An external electric or magnetic field can create coherences between two quantum states in a sample if the frequency corresponds to the energy gap between the two states. The coherence terms decay with the dephasing time or spin–spin relaxation, T_{2}.

After coherence is created in a sample by light, the sample emits a polarization wave, the frequency of which is equal to and the phase of which is inverted from the incident light. In addition, the sample is excited by the incident light and a population of molecules in the excited state is generated. The light passing through the sample is absorbed because of these two processes, and it is expressed by an absorption spectrum. The coherence decays with the time constant, T_{2}, and the intensity of the polarization wave is reduced. The population of the excited state also decays with the time constant of the longitudinal relaxation, T_{1}. The time constant T_{2} is usually much smaller than T_{1}, and the bandwidth of the absorption spectrum is related to these time constants by the Fourier transform, so the time constant T_{2} is a main contributor to the bandwidth. The time constant T_{2} has been measured with ultrafast time-resolved spectroscopy directly, such as in photon echo experiments.

What is the dephasing rate of a particle that has an energy E if it is subject to a fluctuating environment that has a temperature T? In particular what is the dephasing rate close to equilibrium (E~T), and what happens in the zero temperature limit? This question has fascinated the mesoscopic community during the last two decades (see references below).

The reason can be understood by describing the conduction in metals as a classical phenomenon with quantum effects all embedded into an effective mass that can be computed quantum mechanically, as also happens to resistance that can be seen as a scattering effect of conduction electrons. When the temperature is lowered and the dimensions of the device are meaningfully reduced, this classical behaviour should disappear and the laws of quantum mechanics should govern the behavior of conducting electrons seen as waves that move ballistically inside the conductor without any kind of dissipation. Most of the time this is what one observes. But it appeared as a surprise to uncover that the so-called dephasing time, that is the time it takes for the conducting electrons to lose their quantum behavior, becomes finite rather than infinite when the temperature approaches zero in mesoscopic devices violating the expectations of the theory of Boris Altshuler, Arkady Aronov and David E. Khmelnitskii. This kind of saturation of the dephasing time at low temperatures is an open problem even as several proposals have been put forward.

== Examples ==
- In nuclear magnetic resonance (NMR) spectroscopy, dephasing between different hydrogen atoms precessing about a magnetic field reduces the signal of the measurement.
  - Similarly, in magnetic resonance imaging, (which is also based on magnetic resonance) spins of magnetic nuclei dephase due to the static magnetic field, causing signal loss and reduced image quality.
- In atom interferometry, vibrations in the environment causes dephasing of atomic matter-wave paths, and reduces the fringe contrast in atom interferometers.
- In superconducting qubits, dephasing between the states of the qubit randomizes the qubit's superposition state. The qubit dephasing is mostly caused by a variety of low-frequency noise sources (sometimes called $1/f$ noise) such as charge and flux noise.

== See also ==
- Quantum decoherence
- Dephasing rate SP formula
- T2
