= Schrödinger–Newton equation =

Nonlinear modification of the Schrödinger equation

The Schrödinger–Newton equation, sometimes referred to as the Newton–Schrödinger or Schrödinger–Poisson equation, is a nonlinear modification of the Schrödinger equation with a Newtonian gravitational potential, where the gravitational potential emerges from the treatment of the wave function as a mass density, including a term that represents interaction of a particle with its own gravitational field. The inclusion of a self-interaction term represents a fundamental alteration of quantum mechanics. It can be written either as a single integro-differential equation or as a coupled system of a Schrödinger and a Poisson equation. In the latter case it is also referred to in the plural form.

The Schrödinger–Newton equation was first considered by Ruffini and Bonazzola in connection with self-gravitating boson stars. In this context of classical general relativity it appears as the non-relativistic limit of either the Klein–Gordon equation or the Dirac equation in a curved space-time together with the Einstein field equations. The equation also describes fuzzy dark matter and approximates classical cold dark matter described by the Vlasov–Poisson equation in the limit that the particle mass is large.

Later on it was proposed as a model to explain the quantum wave function collapse by Lajos Diósi and Roger Penrose, from whom the name "Schrödinger–Newton equation" originates. In this context, matter has quantum properties, while gravity remains classical even at the fundamental level. The Schrödinger–Newton equation was therefore also suggested as a way to test the necessity of quantum gravity.

In a third context, the Schrödinger–Newton equation appears as a Hartree approximation for the mutual gravitational interaction in a system of a large number of particles. In this context, a corresponding equation for the electromagnetic Coulomb interaction was suggested by Philippe Choquard at the 1976 Symposium on Coulomb Systems in Lausanne to describe one-component plasmas. Elliott H. Lieb provided the proof for the existence and uniqueness of a stationary ground state and referred to the equation as the Choquard equation.

== Overview ==
As a coupled system, the Schrödinger–Newton equations are the usual Schrödinger equation with a self-interaction gravitational potential
$$\mathrm i \hbar\ \frac{\partial\Psi}{\ \partial t\ } = -\frac{\ \hbar^2 }{\ 2\ M\ }\ \nabla ^2 \Psi\; +\; V\ \Psi\; +\; M\ \Phi\ \Psi\ ,$$
where V is an ordinary potential, and the gravitational potential $\ \Phi\ ,$ representing the interaction of the particle with its own gravitational field, satisfies the Poisson equation
$$\ \nabla^2 \Phi = 4 \pi\ G\ M\ |\Psi|^2 ~.$$
Because of the back coupling of the wave-function into the potential, it is a nonlinear system.

Replacing $\ \Phi \$ with the solution to the Poisson equation produces the integro-differential form of the Schrödinger–Newton equation for a particle with mass M:
$$\mathrm i \hbar\ \frac{\ \partial \Psi\ }{ \partial t } = \left[\ -\frac{\ \hbar^2 }{\ 2\ M\ }\ \nabla ^2 \; + \; V \; - \; G\ m^2 \int \frac{\ | \Psi(t,\mathbf{y}) |^2}{\ |\mathbf{x} - \mathbf{y}|\ } \; \mathrm{d}^3 y\ \right] \Psi ~,$$
whose Laplacian could also be reduced into a spherial symmerical one set up by
$$\mathrm i \hbar\ \frac{\ \partial \Psi\ }{ \partial t } = \left[\ -\frac{\ \hbar^2 }{\ 2\ M\ }\ \left(\frac 2 r \frac{\partial }{\partial r}+\frac{\partial^2}{\partial r^2}\right) \; + \; V \; - \; G\ M^2 \int \frac{\ | \Psi(t,\mathbf{y}) |^2}{\ |\mathbf{x} - \mathbf{y}|\ } \; \mathrm{d}^3 y\ \right] \Psi ~.$$
It is obtained from the above system of equations by integration of the Poisson equation under the assumption that the potential must vanish at infinity. As it is known, the wave function in the three dimensional space satisfies
$$\rho_{\text{mass}}(\mathbf x) = M|\mathbf \Psi(\mathbf x)|^2, ~.$$
thus, the Poisson equation derived by Newtonian mechanics finally takes the form:
$$\nabla^2\Phi = 4\pi G \rho(\mathbf x) = 4\pi G M |\Psi(\mathbf x)|^2 ~,$$
which is the shown equation above.

Mathematically, the Schrödinger–Newton equation is a special case of the Hartree equation for n = 2. The equation retains most of the properties of the linear Schrödinger equation. In particular, it is invariant under constant phase shifts, leading to conservation of probability and exhibits full Galilei invariance. In addition to these symmetries, a simultaneous transformation
$$m \mapsto \mu\ m   \ ,\qquad   t \mapsto \mu^{-5} t  \ ,\qquad \mathbf{x} \mapsto \mu^{-3} \mathbf{x}  \ ,\qquad   \psi(t, \mathbf{x}) \mapsto \mu^{9/2} \psi(\mu^5 t, \mu^3 \mathbf{x})$$
maps solutions of the Schrödinger–Newton equation to solutions. The stationary equation, which can be obtained in the usual manner via a separation of variables, possesses an infinite family of normalisable solutions of which only the stationary ground state is stable.

=== Relation to semi-classical and quantum gravity ===
The Schrödinger–Newton equation can be derived under the assumption that gravity remains classical, even at the fundamental level, and that the right way to couple quantum matter to gravity is by means of the semiclassical Einstein equations. In this case, a Newtonian gravitational potential term is added to the Schrödinger equation, where the source of this gravitational potential is the expectation value of the mass density operator or mass flux-current. In this regard, if gravity is fundamentally classical, the Schrödinger–Newton equation is a fundamental one-particle equation, which can be generalised to the case of many particles (see below).

If, on the other hand, the gravitational field is quantised, the fundamental Schrödinger equation remains linear. The Schrödinger–Newton equation is then only valid as an approximation for the gravitational interaction in systems of a large number of particles and has no effect on the centre of mass.

== Many-body equation and centre-of-mass motion ==
If the Schrödinger–Newton equation is considered as a fundamental equation, there is a corresponding N-body equation that was already given by Diósi and can be derived from semiclassical gravity in the same way as the one-particle equation:
$$\begin{align}
i \hbar \frac{\partial}{\partial t}\Psi(t,\mathbf{x}_1,\dots, \mathbf{x}_N) =
\bigg(&-\sum_{j=1}^N \frac{\hbar^2}{2 m_j} \nabla_j^2 + \sum_{j \neq k} V_{jk}\big(|\mathbf{x}_j - \mathbf{x}_k|\big) \\
&- G\sum_{j,k=1}^N m_j m_k \int \mathrm{d}^3 \mathbf{y}_1 \cdots \mathrm{d}^3 \mathbf{y}_N \,
\frac{|\Psi(t,\mathbf{y}_1,\dots,\mathbf{y}_N)|^2}{|\mathbf{x}_j - \mathbf{y}_k|} \bigg)
\Psi(t,\mathbf{x}_1,\dots,\mathbf{x}_N).
\end{align}$$
The potential $V_{jk}$ contains all the mutual linear interactions, e.g. electrodynamical Coulomb interactions, while the gravitational-potential term is based on the assumption that all particles perceive the same gravitational potential generated by all the marginal distributions for all the particles together.

In a Born–Oppenheimer-like approximation, this N-particle equation can be separated into two equations, one describing the relative motion, the other providing the dynamics of the centre-of-mass wave-function. For the relative motion, the gravitational interaction does not play a role, since it is usually weak compared to the other interactions represented by $V_{jk}$. But it has a significant influence on the centre-of-mass motion. While $V_{jk}$ only depends on relative coordinates and therefore does not contribute to the centre-of-mass dynamics at all, the nonlinear Schrödinger–Newton interaction does contribute. In the aforementioned approximation, the centre-of-mass wave-function satisfies the following nonlinear Schrödinger equation:
$$i \hbar \frac{\partial\psi_c(t,\mathbf{R})}{\partial t} =
\left(\frac{\hbar^2}{2 M}\nabla^2 -G \int \mathrm{d}^3 \mathbf{R'} \, \int \mathrm{d}^3 \mathbf{y} \, \int \mathrm{d}^3 \mathbf{z} \,
\frac{|\psi_c(t,\mathbf{R'})|^2 \, \rho_c(\mathbf{y})\rho_c(\mathbf{z})}{\left|\mathbf{R} - \mathbf{R'} - \mathbf{y} + \mathbf{z}\right|} \right) \psi_c(t,\mathbf{R}),$$
where M is the total mass, R is the relative coordinate, $\psi_c$ the centre-of-mass wave-function, and $\rho_c$ is the mass density of the many-body system (e.g. a molecule or a rock) relative to its centre of mass.

In the limiting case of a wide wave-function, i.e. where the width of the centre-of-mass distribution is large compared to the size of the considered object, the centre-of-mass motion is approximated well by the Schrödinger–Newton equation for a single particle. The opposite case of a narrow wave-function can be approximated by a harmonic-oscillator potential, where the Schrödinger–Newton dynamics leads to a rotation in phase space.

In the context where the Schrödinger–Newton equation appears as a Hartree approximation, the situation is different. In this case the full N-particle wave-function is considered a product state of N single-particle wave-functions, where each of those factors obeys the Schrödinger–Newton equation. The dynamics of the centre-of-mass, however, remain strictly linear in this picture. This is true in general: nonlinear Hartree equations never have an influence on the centre of mass.

== Significance of effects ==
A rough order-of-magnitude estimate of the regime where effects of the Schrödinger–Newton equation become relevant can be obtained by a rather simple reasoning. For a spherically symmetric Gaussian,
$$\Psi(t=0,r) = (\pi \sigma^2)^{-3/4} \exp\left(-\frac{r^2}{2 \sigma^2}\right),$$
the free linear Schrödinger equation has the solution
$$\Psi(t,r) = (\pi \sigma^2)^{-3/4} \left(1+\frac{i \hbar t}{m \sigma^2}\right)^{-3/2} \exp\left(-\frac{r^2}{2 \sigma^2 \left(1+\frac{i \hbar t}{m \sigma^2}\right)}\right).$$
The peak of the radial probability density $4 \pi r^2 |\Psi|^2$ can be found at
$$r_p = \sigma \sqrt{1+\frac{\hbar^2 t^2}{m^2 \sigma^4}}.$$
Now we set the acceleration
$$\ddot{r}_p = \frac{\hbar^2}{m^2 r_p^3}$$
of this peak probability equal to the acceleration due to Newtonian gravity:
$$\ddot{r} = -\frac{G m}{r^2},$$
using that $r_p = \sigma$ at time $t = 0$. This yields the relation
$$m^3 \sigma = \frac{\hbar^2}{G} \approx 1.7 \times 10^{-58}~\text{m}\,\text{kg}^3,$$
which allows us to determine a critical width for a given mass value and conversely. We also recognise the scaling law mentioned above. Numerical simulations show that this equation gives a rather good estimate of the mass regime above which effects of the Schrödinger–Newton equation become significant.

For an atom the critical width is around 10^{22} metres, while it is already down to 10^{−31} metres for a mass of one microgram. The regime where the mass is around 10^{10} Da while the width is of the order of micrometres is expected to allow an experimental test of the Schrödinger–Newton equation in the future. A possible candidate are interferometry experiments with heavy molecules, which currently reach masses up to 10000 Da.

== Quantum wave function collapse ==
The idea that gravity causes (or somehow influences) the wavefunction collapse dates back to the 1960s and was originally proposed by Károlyházy. The Schrödinger–Newton equation was proposed in this context by Diósi. There the equation provides an estimation for the "line of demarcation" between microscopic (quantum) and macroscopic (classical) objects. The stationary ground state has a width of
$$a_0 \approx \frac{\hbar^2}{G m^3}.$$
For a well-localised homogeneous sphere, i.e. a sphere with a centre-of-mass wave-function that is narrow compared to the radius of the sphere, Diósi finds as an estimate for the width of the ground-state centre-of-mass wave-function
$$a_0^{(R)} \approx a_0^{1/4} R^{3/4}.$$
Assuming a usual density around 1000 kg/m^{3}, a critical radius can be calculated for which $a_0^{(R)} \approx R$. This critical radius is around a tenth of a micrometre.

Roger Penrose proposed that the Schrödinger–Newton equation mathematically describes the basis states involved in a gravitationally induced wavefunction collapse scheme. Penrose suggests that a superposition of two or more quantum states having a significant amount of mass displacement ought to be unstable and reduce to one of the states within a finite time. He hypothesises that there exists a "preferred" set of states that could collapse no further, specifically, the stationary states of the Schrödinger–Newton equation. A macroscopic system can therefore never be in a spatial superposition, since the nonlinear gravitational self-interaction immediately leads to a collapse to a stationary state of the Schrödinger–Newton equation. According to Penrose's idea, when a quantum particle is measured, there is an interplay of this nonlinear collapse and environmental decoherence. The gravitational interaction leads to the reduction of the environment to one distinct state, and decoherence leads to the localisation of the particle, e.g. as a dot on a screen.

=== Problems and open matters ===
Three major problems occur with this interpretation of the Schrödinger–Newton equation as the cause of the wave-function collapse:

1. Excessive residual probability far from the collapse point
2. Lack of any apparent reason for the Born rule
3. Promotion of the previously strictly hypothetical wave function to an observable (real) quantity.

First, numerical studies agreeingly find that when a wave packet "collapses" to a stationary solution, a small portion of it seems to run away to infinity. This would mean that even a completely collapsed quantum system still can be found at a distant location. Since the solutions of the linear Schrödinger equation tend towards infinity even faster, this only indicates that the Schrödinger–Newton equation alone is not sufficient to explain the wave-function collapse. If the environment is taken into account, this effect might disappear and therefore not be present in the scenario described by Penrose.

A second problem, also arising in Penrose's proposal, is the origin of the Born rule: To solve the measurement problem, a mere explanation of why a wave-function collapses – e.g., to a dot on a screen – is not enough. A good model for the collapse process also has to explain why the dot appears on different positions of the screen, with probabilities that are determined by the squared absolute-value of the wave-function. It might be possible that a model based on Penrose's idea could provide such an explanation, but there is as yet no known reason that Born's rule would naturally arise from it.

Thirdly, since the gravitational potential is linked to the wave-function in the picture of the Schrödinger–Newton equation, the wave-function must be interpreted as a real object. Therefore, at least in principle, it becomes a measurable quantity. Making use of the nonlocal nature of entangled quantum systems, this could be used to send signals faster than light, which is generally thought to be in contradiction with causality. It is, however, not clear whether this problem can be resolved by applying the right collapse prescription, yet to be found, consistently to the full quantum system. Also, since gravity is such a weak interaction, it is not clear that such an experiment can be actually performed within the parameters given in our universe (see the referenced discussion about a similar thought experiment proposed by Eppley & Hannah).

== See also ==
- Nonlinear Schrödinger equation
- Semiclassical gravity
- Penrose interpretation
- Poisson's equation
