= Ghirardi–Rimini–Weber theory =

Objective collapse theory in quantum mechanics

The Ghirardi–Rimini–Weber (GRW) theory is a spontaneous collapse theory in quantum mechanics, proposed in 1986 by Giancarlo Ghirardi, Alberto Rimini, and Tullio Weber.

== Measurement problem and spontaneous collapses ==
Quantum mechanics has two fundamentally different dynamical principles: the linear and deterministic Schrödinger equation, and the nonlinear and stochastic wave packet reduction postulate. The orthodox interpretation, or Copenhagen interpretation of quantum mechanics, posits a wave function collapse every time an observer performs a measurement. One thus faces the problem of defining what an "observer" and a "measurement" are. Another issue of quantum mechanics is that it forecasts superpositions of macroscopic objects, which are not observed in nature (see Schrödinger's cat paradox). The theory does not tell where the threshold between the microscopic and macroscopic worlds is, that is when quantum mechanics should leave space to classical mechanics. The aforementioned issues constitute the measurement problem in quantum mechanics.

Collapse theories avoid the measurement problem by merging the two dynamical principles of quantum mechanics in a unique dynamical description. The physical idea that underlies collapse theories is that particles undergo spontaneous wave-function collapses, which occur randomly both in time (at a given average rate), and in space (according to the Born rule). The imprecise "observer" and "measurement" that plague the orthodox interpretation are thus avoided because the wave function collapses spontaneously. Furthermore, thanks to a so-called "amplification mechanism" (later discussed), collapse theories recover both quantum mechanics for microscopic objects, and classical mechanics for macroscopic ones.

The GRW is the first spontaneous collapse theory that was devised. In the following years several different models were proposed. Among these are

- the continuous spontaneous localization model (CSL model), which is formulated in terms of identical particles;
- the Diósi–Penrose model, which relates the spontaneous collapse to gravity;
- the quantum mechanics with universal position localization (QMUPL) model, which proves important mathematical results on collapse theories; and the coloured QMUPL model, which is the only collapse model involving coloured stochastic processes for which the exact solution is known.

== Description ==
The first assumption of the GRW theory is that the wave function (or state vector) represents the most accurate possible specification of the state of a physical system. This is a feature that the GRW theory shares with the standard Interpretations of quantum mechanics, and distinguishes it from hidden variable theories, like the de Broglie–Bohm theory, according to which the wave function does not give a complete description of a physical system. The GRW theory differs from standard quantum mechanics for the dynamical principles according to which the wave function evolves. More philosophical issues related to the GRW theory and to collapse theories in general one have been discussed by Ghirardi and Bassi.

=== Working principles ===
- Each particle of a system described by the multi-particle wave function $|\psi\rangle$ independently undergoes a spontaneous localization process (or jump):

$$|\psi\rangle\rightarrow\frac{|\psi_x^i\rangle}{\sqrt{\langle\psi_x^i|\psi_x^i\rangle}},$$
where $|\psi_x^i\rangle=\hat{L}_x^i|\psi\rangle$ is the state after the operator $\hat{L}_x^i$ has localized the $i$-th particle around the position $x$.

- The localization process is random both in space and time. The jumps are Poisson distributed in time, with mean rate $\lambda$; the probability density for a jump to occur at position $x$ is $P_i(x)=\langle\psi_x^i|\psi_x^i\rangle$.
- The localization operator has a Gaussian form:

$$\hat{L}_x^i=\left(\frac{1}{\pi r_C^2}\right)^{\frac{3}{4}}e^{-\frac{(\hat{q}_i-x)^2}{2r_C^2}},$$
where $\hat{q}_i$ is the position operator of the $i$-th particle, and $r_C$ is the localization distance.

- In between two localization processes, the wave function evolves according to the Schrödinger equation.

These principles can be expressed in a more compact way with the statistical operator formalism. Since the localization process is Poissonian, in a time interval $dt$ there is a probability $\lambda dt$ that a collapse occurs, i.e. that the pure state $\rho=|\psi\rangle\langle\psi|$ is transformed into the statistical mixture
$$\hat{T}_i[\rho]\equiv\int dx \,\hat{L}_x^i |\psi\rangle\langle\psi|\hat{L}_x^i.$$

In the same time interval, there is a probability $1-\lambda dt$ that the system keeps evolving according to the Schrödinger equation. Accordingly, the GRW master equation for $N$ particles reads
$$\frac{d}{dt}\rho(t)=-\frac{i}{\hbar}[\hat{H},\rho(t)]-\sum_{i=1}^N\lambda_i\left(\rho(t)-\hat{T}_i[\rho]\right),$$
where $\hat{H}$ is the Hamiltonian of the system, and the square brackets denote a commutator.

Two new parameters are introduced by the GRW theory, namely the collapse rate $\lambda$ and the localization distance $r_C$. These are phenomenological parameters, whose values are not fixed by any principle and should be understood as new constants of Nature. Comparison of the model's predictions with experimental data permits bounding of the values of the parameters (see CSL model). The collapse rate should be such that microscopic object are almost never localized, thus effectively recovering standard quantum mechanics. The value originally proposed was $\lambda=10^{-16}\mathrm{s}^{-1}$, while more recently Stephen L. Adler proposed that the value $\lambda=10^{-8}\mathrm{s}^{-1}$ (with an uncertainty of two orders of magnitude) is more adequate. There is a general consensus on the value $r_C=10^{-7}\mathrm{m}$ for the localization distance. This is a mesoscopic distance, such that microscopic superpositions are left unaltered, while macroscopic ones are collapsed.

== Examples ==
When the wave function is hit by a sudden jump, the action of the localization operator essentially results in the multiplication of the wave function by the collapse Gaussian.

Let us consider a Gaussian wave function with spread $\sigma$, centered at $x=a$, and let us assume that this undergoes a localization process at the position $x=a$. One thus has (in one dimension)

$$\psi(x)=\frac{1}{(\pi\sigma)^{\frac{1}{4}}}\,e^{-\frac{(x-a)^2}{2\sigma^2}}\quad\longrightarrow\quad\psi_a(x)=\hat{L}_{x=a}\,\psi(x)={\cal N}e^{-\frac{(x-a)^2}{2r_C^2}}\,e^{-\frac{(x-a)^2}{2\sigma^2}},$$

where ${\cal N}$ is a normalization factor. Let us further assume that the initial state is delocalised, i.e. that $\sigma\gg r_C$. In this case one has

$\psi_a(x)\simeq{\cal N}'e^{-\frac{(x-a)^2}{2r_C^2}}$,

where ${\cal N}'$ is another normalization factor. One thus finds that after the sudden jump has occurred, the initially delocalised wave function has become localized.

Another interesting case is when the initial state is the superposition of two Gaussian states, centered at $x=-a$ and $x=a$ respectively: $\psi(x)=\frac{1}{2(\pi\sigma)^{\frac{1}{4}}}\,\left[e^{-\frac{(x+a)^2}{2\sigma^2}}+e^{-\frac{(x-a)^2}{2\sigma^2}}\right].$ If the localization occurs e.g. around $x=a$ one has

$\psi_a(x)={\cal N}e^{-\frac{(x-a)^2}{2r_C^2}}\left[e^{-\frac{(x+a)^2}{2\sigma^2}}+e^{-\frac{(x-a)^2}{2\sigma^2}}\right]={\cal N}\left[e^{-\frac{\sigma^2+r_C^2}{2\sigma^2r_C^2}\,\left(x+\frac{\sigma^2-r_C^2}{\sigma^2+r_C^2}a\right)^2-\frac{2a^2}{\sigma^2+r_C^2}}+e^{-\frac{\sigma^2+r_C^2}{2\sigma^2r_C^2}\,(x-a)^2}\right]$.

If one assumes that each Gaussian is localized ($\sigma\ll r_C$) and that the overall superposition is delocalised ($2a\gg r_C$), one finds

$\psi_a(x)\simeq{\cal N}'\left[e^{-\frac{\left(x+a\right)^2}{2\sigma^2}-\frac{2a^2}{r_C^2}}+e^{-\frac{(x-a)^2}{2\sigma^2}}\right]$.

We thus see that the Gaussian that is hit by the localization is left unchanged, while the other is exponentially suppressed.

== Amplification mechanism ==
This is one of the most important features of the GRW theory, because it allows us to recover classical mechanics for macroscopic objects. Let us consider a rigid body of $N$ particles whose statistical operator evolves according to the master equation described above. We introduce the center of mass ($\hat{Q}$) and relative ($\hat{r}_i$) position operators, which allow us to rewrite each particle's position operator as follows: $\hat{q}_i=\hat{Q}+\hat{r}_i$. One can show that, when the system Hamiltonian can be split into a center of mass Hamiltonian $H_{\mathrm{CM}}$ and a relative Hamiltonian $H_r$, the center of mass statistical operator $\rho_{\mathrm{CM}}$ evolves according to the following master equation:

$$\frac{d}{dt}\rho_{\mathrm{CM}}(t)=-\frac{i}{\hbar}[\hat{H}_{\mathrm{CM}},\rho_{\mathrm{CM}}(t)]-\sum_{i=1}^N\lambda_i\left(\rho_{\mathrm{CM}}(t)-\hat{T}_{\mathrm{CM}}[\rho_{\mathrm{CM}}(t)]\right),$$

where

$$\hat{T}_{\mathrm{CM}}[\rho_{\mathrm{CM}}(t)]=\left(\frac{1}{\pi r_C^2}\right)^{\frac{3}{2}}\int_\infty^\infty d^3x\,e^{-\frac{(\hat{Q}-x)^2}{2r_C^2}}\,\rho_{\mathrm{CM}}(t)\,e^{-\frac{(\hat{Q}-x)^2}{2r_C^2}}.$$

One thus sees that the center of mass collapses with a rate $\Lambda$ that is the sum of the rates of its constituents: this is the amplification mechanism. If for simplicity one assumes that all particles collapse with the same rate $\lambda$, one simply gets $\Lambda=N\,\lambda$.

An object that consists of in the order of the Avogadro number of nucleons ($N\simeq10^{23}$) collapses almost instantly: GRW's and Adler's values of $\lambda$ give respectively $\Lambda=10^7\,\mathrm{s}^{-1}$ and $\Lambda=10^{15}\,\mathrm{s}^{-1}$. Fast reduction of macroscopic object superpositions is thus guaranteed, and the GRW theory effectively recovers classical mechanics for macroscopic objects.

== Other features ==
- The GRW theory makes different predictions than standard quantum mechanics, (Note: It has "as its practically unique effect, that of inducing a very fast suppression of coherence among macroscopically distinguishable states", see) and as such can be tested against it (see CSL model).
- The collapse noise repeatedly kicks the particles, thus inducing a diffusion process (Brownian motion). This introduces a steady amount of energy into the system, thus leading to a violation of the energy conservation principle. For the GRW model, one can show that energy grows linearly in time with rate $\lambda\hbar^2/4mr_C^2$ , which for a macroscopic object amounts to $\simeq 10^{-14} \mathrm{erg\,\,s}^{-1}$. Although such an energy increase is negligible, this feature of the model is not appealing. For this reason, a dissipative extension of the GRW theory has been investigated.
- The GRW theory does not allow for identical particles. An extension of the theory with identical particles has been proposed by Tumulka.
- GRW is a non relativistic theory. A relativistic extension of the theory for non-interacting particles has been investigated by Tumulka, while interacting models are still under investigation.
- The master equation of the GRW theory describes a decoherence process according to which the off-diagonal elements of the statistical operator are suppressed exponentially. This is a feature that the GRW theory shares with other collapse theories: those involving white noises are associated to Lindblad master equations, while the coloured QMUPL model follows a non-Markovian Gaussian master equation.

== See also ==
- Penrose interpretation
- Interpretations of quantum mechanics
