= Diósi–Penrose model =

Possible solution to the measurement problem

The Diósi–Penrose model was introduced as a possible solution to the measurement problem, where the wave function collapse is related to gravity. The model was first suggested by Lajos Diósi when studying how possible gravitational fluctuations may affect the dynamics of quantum systems. Later, following a different line of reasoning, Roger Penrose arrived at an estimation for the collapse time of a superposition due to gravitational effects, which is the same (within an unimportant numerical factor) as that found by Diósi, hence the name Diósi–Penrose model. However, it should be pointed out that while Diósi gave a precise dynamical equation for the collapse, Penrose took a more conservative approach, estimating only the collapse time of a superposition.

== Diósi model ==
In the Diósi model, the wave-function collapse is induced by the interaction of the system with a classical noise field, where the spatial correlation function of this noise is related to the Newtonian potential. The evolution of the state vector $|\psi_{t}\rangle$ deviates from the Schrödinger equation and has the typical structure of the collapse models equations:

$$\begin{align} d|\psi_{t}\rangle &= \Bigg[-\frac{i}{\hbar} H\,dt + \sqrt{\frac{G}{\hbar}} \int d\mathbf{x}\,\big(\mathcal{M}(\mathbf{x}) - \langle\mathcal{M}(\mathbf{x})\rangle_t\big)\,dW(\mathbf{x},t) \\ &\qquad {} - \frac{G}{2\hbar} \int d\mathbf{x}\int d\mathbf{y}\, \frac{\big(\mathcal{M}(\mathbf{x}) - \langle\mathcal{M}(\mathbf{x})\rangle_t\big) \big(\mathcal{M}(\mathbf{y}) - \langle\mathcal{M}(\mathbf{y})\rangle_t\big)} {|\mathbf{x} - \mathbf{y}|}\,dt\Bigg]| \psi_t\rangle, \end{align}$$	1

where

$\mathcal{M}(\mathbf{x}) = \sum_j m_j \mu_{R_0}(\mathbf{x} - \hat{\mathbf{x}}_j)$	2

is the mass density function, with $m_j$, $\hat{\mathbf{x}}_j$ and $\mu_{R_0}(\mathbf{x})$ respectively the mass, the position operator and the mass density function of the $j$-th particle of the system. $R_0$ is a parameter introduced to smear the mass density function, required since taking a point-like mass distribution

$$\mathcal{M}_\text{point}(\mathbf{x}) = \sum_{j=1}^N m_j \delta(\mathbf{x} - \hat{\mathbf{x}}_j)$$

would lead to divergences in the predictions of the model, e.g. an infinite collapse rate or increase of energy. Typically, two different distributions for the mass density $\mu_{R_0}(\mathbf{x} - \hat{\mathbf{x}}_j)$ have been considered in the literature: a spherical or a Gaussian mass density profile, given respectively by

$$\mu_{R_0}^\text{s}(\mathbf{x} - \hat{\mathbf{x}}_j) = \frac{3}{4\pi R_0^3} \theta\big(|\mathbf{x} - \hat{\mathbf{x}}_j| - R_0\big)$$

and

$$\mu_{R_{0}}^\text{g}(\mathbf{x} - \hat{\mathbf{x}}_j) = \frac{1}{(2\pi R_0^2)^{3/2}}\,\exp\left(-\frac{(\mathbf{x} - \hat{\mathbf{x}}_j)^2}{2R_0^2}\right).$$

Choosing one or another distribution $\mu_{R_0}(\mathbf{x} - \hat{\mathbf{x}}_j)$ does not affect significantly the predictions of the model, as long as the same value for $R_0$ is considered. The noise field $w(\mathbf{x}, t) := \frac{dW(\mathbf{x}, t)}{dt}$ in Eq. (1) has zero average and correlation given by

$\mathbb{E}\left[w(\mathbf{x}, t) w(\mathbf{y}, s)\right] = \frac{1}{|\mathbf{x} - \mathbf{y}|} \delta(t - s),$	3

where "$\mathbb{E}$" denotes the average over the noise. One can then understand from Eq. (1) and (3) in which sense the model is gravity-related: the coupling constant between the system and the noise is proportional to the gravitational constant $G$, and the spatial correlation of the noise field $w(\mathbf{x}, t)$ has the typical form of a Newtonian potential. Similarly to other collapse models, the Diósi–Penrose model shares the following two features:

- The model describes a collapse in position.
- There is an amplification mechanism, which guarantees that more massive objects localize more effectively.

In order to show these features, it is convenient to write the master equation for the statistical operator $\rho(t) = \mathbb{E}\big[|\psi_t\rangle \langle\psi_t|\big]$ corresponding to Eq. (1):

$\frac{d\rho(t)}{dt} = -\frac{i}{\hbar} [H, \rho(t)] + \frac{G}{\hbar} \iint \frac{d\mathbf{x}\,d\mathbf{y}}{|\mathbf{x} - \mathbf{y}|} \left(\mathcal{M}(\mathbf{x}) \rho(t) \mathcal{M}(\mathbf{y}) - \frac{1}{2} \{\mathcal{M}(\mathbf{x}) \mathcal{M}(\mathbf{y}), \rho(t)\} \right).$	4

It is interesting to point out that this master equation has more recently been re-derived by L. Diósi using a hybrid approach where quantized massive particles interact with classical gravitational fields.

If one considers the master equation in the position basis, introducing $\rho(\vec{\boldsymbol{a}}, \vec{\boldsymbol{b}}, t) := \langle\vec{\boldsymbol{a}}|\rho(t)|\vec{\boldsymbol{b}}\rangle$ with $|\vec{\boldsymbol{a}}\rangle := |\boldsymbol{a}_1\rangle \otimes \dots \otimes |\boldsymbol{a}_N\rangle$, where $|\boldsymbol{a}_j\rangle$ is a position eigenstate of the $j$-th particle, neglecting the free evolution, one finds

$\frac{d\rho(\vec{\boldsymbol{a}}, \vec{\boldsymbol{b}}, t)}{dt} = -\Lambda(\vec{\boldsymbol{a}}, \vec{\boldsymbol{b}}) \rho(\vec{\boldsymbol{a}}, \vec{\boldsymbol{b}}, t)$	5

with

$\Lambda(\vec{\boldsymbol{a}}, \vec{\boldsymbol{b}}) = \frac{G}{2\hbar} \iint d\mathbf{x}\,d\mathbf{y}\, \frac{\big(\mathcal{M}(\mathbf{x}, \vec{\boldsymbol{a}}) - \mathcal{M}(\mathbf{x}, \vec{\boldsymbol{b}})\big) \big(\mathcal{M}(\mathbf{y}, \vec{\boldsymbol{a}}) - \mathcal{M}(\mathbf{y}, \vec{\boldsymbol{b}})\big)}{|\mathbf{x} - \mathbf{y}|},$	6

where

$$\mathcal{M}(\mathbf{x}, \vec{\boldsymbol{a}}) := \sum_j m_j \mu_{R_0}(\mathbf{x} - \boldsymbol{a}_j)$$

is the mass density when the particles of the system are centered at the points $\boldsymbol{a}_1$, ..., $\boldsymbol{a}_N$. Eq. (5) can be solved exactly, and one gets

$\rho(\vec{\boldsymbol{a}}, \vec{\boldsymbol{b}}, t) = \rho(\vec{\boldsymbol{a}}, \vec{\boldsymbol{b}}, 0) e^{-t/\tau_{\text{DP}}(\vec{\boldsymbol{a}}, \vec{\boldsymbol{b}})},$	7

where

$\tau_{\text{DP}}(\vec{\boldsymbol{a}}, \vec{\boldsymbol{b}}) = \frac{1}{\Lambda(\vec{\boldsymbol{a}}, \vec{\boldsymbol{b}})}.$	8

As expected, for the diagonal terms of the density matrix, when $\vec{\boldsymbol{a}} = \vec{\boldsymbol{b}}$, one has $\Lambda(\vec{\boldsymbol{a}}, \vec{\boldsymbol{a}}) = 0$, i.e. the time of decay goes to infinity, implying that states with well-localized position are not affected by the collapse. On the contrary, the off-diagonal terms $\vec{\boldsymbol{a}} \neq \vec{\boldsymbol{b}}$, which are different from zero when a spatial superposition is involved, will decay with a time of decay given by Eq. (8).

To get an idea of the scale at which the gravitationally induced collapse becomes relevant, one can compute the time of decay in Eq. (8) for the case of a sphere with radius $R_0$ and mass $m$ in a spatial superposition at a distance $d: = |\boldsymbol{a} - \boldsymbol{b}|$. Then the time of decay can be computed) using Eq. (8) with

$$\Lambda(d) = \begin{cases} \dfrac{6GM^2}{5R_0\hbar} \left(\dfrac{5}{3}\lambda^2 - \dfrac{5}{4}\lambda^3 + \dfrac{1}{6}\lambda^5\right) & \text{when } 0 \leq \lambda \leq 1, \\ \dfrac{6GM^2}{5R_0\hbar} \left(1 - \dfrac{5}{12\lambda}\right) & \text{when } \lambda \geq 1, \end{cases}$$	8

where $\lambda = d/(2R_0)$. To give some examples, if one considers a proton, for which $m \simeq 1.67 \times 10^{-27}$ kg and $R_0 \simeq 10^{-15}$ m, in a superposition with $d \gg R_0$, one gets $\tau_\text{DP} \simeq 10^6$ years. On the contrary, for a dust grain with $m \simeq 6 \times 10^{-12}$ kg and $R_0 \simeq 10^{-5}$ m, one gets $\tau_\text{DP} \simeq 10^{-8}$ s. Therefore, contrary to what might be expected considering the weaknesses of gravitational force, the effects of the gravity-related collapse become relevant already at the mesoscopic scale.

Recently, the model has been generalized by including dissipative and non-Markovian effects.

== Penrose's proposal ==
It is well known that general relativity and quantum mechanics, our most fundamental theories for describing the universe, are not compatible, and the unification of the two is still missing. The standard approach to overcome this situation is to try to modify general relativity by quantizing gravity. Penrose suggests an opposite approach, what he calls "gravitization of quantum mechanics", where quantum mechanics gets modified when gravitational effects become relevant. The reasoning underlying this approach is the following one: take a massive system of well-localized states in space. In this case, the state being well-localized, the induced space–time curvature is well defined. According to quantum mechanics, because of the superposition principle, the system can be placed (at least in principle) in a superposition of two well-localized states, which would lead to a superposition of two different space–times. The key idea is that since space–time metric should be well defined, nature "dislikes" these space–time superpositions and suppresses them by collapsing the wave function to one of the two localized states.

To set these ideas on a more quantitative ground, Penrose suggested that a way for measuring the difference between two space–times, in the Newtonian limit, is

$\Delta E_G = \frac{1}{G} \int d\boldsymbol{r}\, \big(g_a(\boldsymbol{r}) - g_b(\boldsymbol{r})\big)^2,$	9

where $g_i(\boldsymbol{r})$ is the Newtonian gravitational acceleration at the point where the system is localized around $i$. The acceleration $g_i(\boldsymbol{r})$ can be written in terms of the corresponding gravitational potentials $\Phi_i(\boldsymbol{r})$, i.e. $g_i(\boldsymbol{r}) = -\nabla\Phi_i(\boldsymbol{r})$. Using this relation in Eq. (9), together with the Poisson equation $\nabla^2\Phi_i(\boldsymbol{r}) = 4\pi G\mu_i(\boldsymbol{r})$, with $\mu_i(\boldsymbol{r})$ giving the mass density when the state is localized around $i$, and its solution, one arrives at

$\Delta E_G = 4\pi G \int d\boldsymbol{r} \int d\boldsymbol{r}'\, \frac{[\mu_a(\boldsymbol{r}) - \mu_b(\boldsymbol{r})] [\mu_a(\boldsymbol{r}') - \mu_b(\boldsymbol{r}')]}{|\boldsymbol{r} - \boldsymbol{r}'|}.$	10

The corresponding decay time can be obtained by the Heisenberg time–energy uncertainty:

$\tau_G = \frac{\hbar}{\Delta E_G},$	11

which, apart for a factor $8\pi$ simply due to the use of different conventions, is exactly the same as the time decay $\tau_\text{DP}$ derived by Diósi's model. This is the reason why the two proposals are named together as the Diósi–Penrose model.

More recently, Penrose suggested a new and quite elegant way to justify the need for a gravity-induced collapse, based on avoiding tensions between the superposition principle and the equivalence principle, the cornerstones of quantum mechanics and general relativity. In order to explain it, let us start by comparing the evolution of a generic state in the presence of uniform gravitational acceleration $\boldsymbol{g}$. One way to perform the calculation, what Penrose calls "Newtonian perspective", consists in working in an inertial frame, with space–time coordinates $(\boldsymbol{r}, t)$ and solve the Schrödinger equation in presence of the potential $V(\boldsymbol{x}) = m\boldsymbol{g} \cdot \boldsymbol{x}$ (typically, one chooses the coordinates in such a way that the acceleration $\boldsymbol{g}$ is directed along the $z$ axis, in which case $V(z) = mgz$). Alternatively, because of the equivalence principle, one can choose to go in the free-fall reference frame, with coordinates $(\boldsymbol{R}, T)$ related to $(\boldsymbol{r}, t)$ by $\boldsymbol{R} = \boldsymbol{r} + \frac{1}{2} \boldsymbol{g} t^2$ and $T = t$, solve the free Schrödinger equation in that reference frame, and then write the results in terms of the inertial coordinates $(\boldsymbol{r}, t)$. This is what Penrose calls "Einsteinian perspective". The solution $\Psi(\boldsymbol{r}, t)$ obtained in the Einsteinian perspective and the one $\psi(\boldsymbol{r}, t)$ obtained in the Newtonian perspective are related to each other by

$\Psi(\boldsymbol{r}, t) = e^{i\frac{m}{\hbar} \left(\frac{1}{6} g^2 t^3 + \boldsymbol{g} \cdot \boldsymbol{r}\,t\right)} \psi(\boldsymbol{r}, t).$	12

Since the two wave functions are equivalent apart from an overall phase, they lead to the same physical predictions, which implies that there are no problems in this situation where the gravitational field always has a well-defined value. However, if the space–time metric is not well defined, then we will be in a situation where there is a superposition of a gravitational field corresponding to the acceleration $\boldsymbol{g}_a$ and one corresponding to the acceleration $\boldsymbol{g}_b$. This does not create problems as long as one sticks to the Newtonian perspective. However, when using the Einstenian perspective, it will imply a phase difference between the two branches of the superposition given by $e^{i\frac{m}{\hbar} \left(\frac{1}{6} (\boldsymbol{g}_a - \boldsymbol{g}_b)^2 t^3 + (\boldsymbol{g}_a - \boldsymbol{g}_b) \cdot \boldsymbol{r}\,t\right)}$. While the term in the exponent linear in the time $t$ does not lead to any conceptual difficulty, the first term, proportional to $t^3$, is problematic, since it is a non-relativistic residue of the so-called Unruh effect: in other words, the two terms in the superposition belong to different Hilbert spaces and, strictly speaking, cannot be superposed. Here is where the gravity-induced collapse plays a role, collapsing the superposition when the first term of the phase $\frac{1}{6} (g_a - g_b)^2 t^3$ becomes too large.

Further information on Penrose's idea for the gravity-induced collapse can be also found in the Penrose interpretation.

== Experimental tests and theoretical bounds ==
Since the Diósi–Penrose model predicts deviations from standard quantum mechanics, the model can be tested. The only free parameter of the model is the size of the mass density distribution, given by $R_0$. All bounds present in the literature are based on an indirect effect of the gravitational-related collapse: a Brownian-like diffusion induced by the collapse on the motion of the particles. This Brownian-like diffusion is a common feature of all objective-collapse theories and, typically, allows to set the strongest bounds on the parameters of these models. The first bound on $R_0$ was set by Ghirardi et al., where it was shown that $R_0 > 10^{-15}$ m to avoid unrealistic heating due to this Brownian-like induced diffusion. Then the bound has been further restricted to $R_0 > 4 \times 10^{-14}$ m by the analysis of the data from gravitational wave detectors. and later to $R_0 \gtrsim 10^{-13}$ m by studying the heating of neutron stars.

Regarding direct interferometric tests of the model, where a system is prepared in a spatial superposition, there are two proposals currently considered: an optomechanical setup with a mesoscopic mirror to be placed in a superposition by a laser, and experiments involving superpositions of Bose–Einstein condensates.

== See also ==
- Measurement problem
- Interpretation of quantum mechanics
- Penrose interpretation
- Gravitational decoherence
- Wave function collapse
- Objective-collapse theory
- Ghirardi–Rimini–Weber theory
