= Free-orbit experiment with laser interferometry X-rays =

Belongs to a category of experiments

The Free-orbit Experiment with Laser Interferometry X-Rays (FELIX) belongs to a category of experiments exploring whether macroscopic systems can be in superposition states. It was originally proposed by the physicist Roger Penrose in his 2004 book The Road to Reality specifically to prove whether unconventional decoherence processes such as gravitationally induced decoherence or spontaneous wave-function collapse of a quantum system occur.

Later revised to take place as a tabletop experiment, if successful, it is estimated that a tiny mirror with a mass of roughly 10^{14} atoms would have been superposed, approximately nine orders of magnitude more massive than any superposition observed to that date (2003).

== Configuration ==
A Michelson interferometer

The proposed experimental setup is basically a variation of the Michelson interferometer but for a single photon. Additionally, one of the mirrors has to be very tiny and fixed on an isolated micromechanical-oscillator. This allows it to move when the photon is reflected on it, so that it may become superposed with the photon. The purpose is to vary the size of the mirror to investigate the effect of the mass on the time it takes for the quantum system to collapse.

Originally the arms of the interferometer had to stretch into the hundreds of thousands of kilometers to achieve a photon roundtrip-time comparable to the oscillator's period, but that meant that the experiment had to take place in-orbit, reducing its viability. The revised proposal requires that the mirrors be placed into high-finesse optical cavities that will trap the photons long enough to achieve the desired delay.

There are various technological challenges, but all are within high-end laboratory capabilities. The primary requirement is that the mass of the cavity remains as small as possible. To avoid noise on the interferometer and have a low probability of emitting more than one photon each time, a very low absolute temperature for the experiment is needed, on the order of 60 μK. For similar reasons, and to avoid decoherence, the experimental device has to be in ultra-high vacuum conditions. The wavelength of the photons was calculated to be roughly 630 nm so the reflecting surfaces can be as small as possible and yet avoid refraction and reflectivity issues. The micromechanical-oscillator can be similar to the cantilevers in atomic force microscopy and the reflective surfaces typically used in similar high-demanding experiments pose no real challenge. The tiny mirror is optically cooled using a laser before each run of the experiment, which gets the mirror very close to its ground state. This technique has been successfully used in the LIGO gravitational wave experiment.

== See also ==
- Penrose interpretation
- Objective collapse theory
