= Beam splitter =

Optical device which splits a beam of light in two

Schematic illustration of a beam splitter cube. 1 - Incident light 2 - 50% transmitted light 3 - 50% reflected light In practice, the reflective layer absorbs some light.

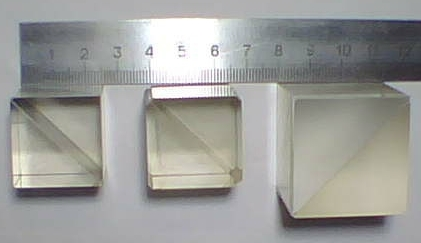
Beam splitters

A beam splitter or beamsplitter is an optical device that splits a beam of light into a transmitted and a reflected beam. It is a crucial part of many optical experimental and measurement systems, such as interferometers, also finding widespread application in fibre optic telecommunications.

== Designs ==
In its most common form, a cube, a beam splitter is made from two triangular glass prisms which are glued together at their base using polyester, epoxy, or urethane-based adhesives. (Before these synthetic resins, natural ones were used, e.g. Canada balsam.) The thickness of the resin layer is adjusted such that (for a certain wavelength) half of the light incident through one "port" (i.e., face of the cube) is reflected and the other half is transmitted due to FTIR (frustrated total internal reflection). Polarizing beam splitters, such as the Wollaston prism, use birefringent materials to split light into two beams of orthogonal polarization states.

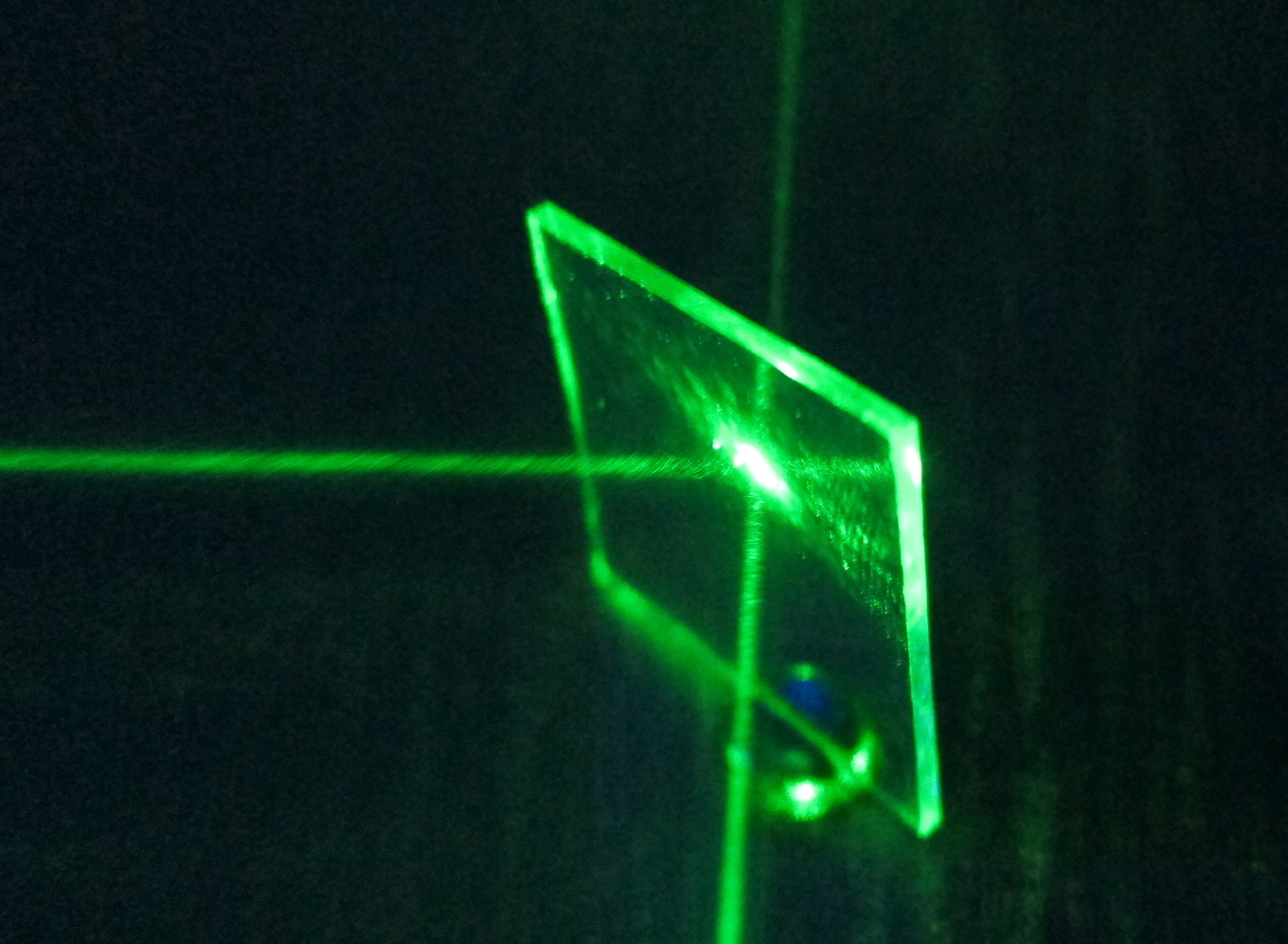
Aluminium-coated beam splitter.

Another design is the use of a half-silvered mirror. This is composed of an optical substrate, which is often a sheet of glass or plastic, with a partially transparent thin coating of metal. The thin coating can be aluminium deposited from aluminium vapor using a physical vapor deposition method. The thickness of the deposit is controlled so that part (typically half) of the light, which is incident at a 45-degree angle and not absorbed by the coating or substrate material, is transmitted and the remainder is reflected. A very thin half-silvered mirror used in photography is often called a pellicle mirror. To reduce loss of light due to absorption by the reflective coating, so-called "Swiss-cheese" beam-splitter mirrors have been used. Originally, these were sheets of highly polished metal perforated with holes to obtain the desired ratio of reflection to transmission. Later, metal was sputtered onto glass so as to form a discontinuous coating, or small areas of a continuous coating were removed by chemical or mechanical action to produce a very literally "half-silvered" surface.

Instead of a metallic coating, a dichroic optical coating may be used. Depending on its characteristics (thin-film interference), the ratio of reflection to transmission will vary as a function of the wavelength of the incident light. Dichroic mirrors are used in some ellipsoidal reflector spotlights to split off unwanted infrared (heat) radiation, and as output couplers in laser construction.

A third version of the beam splitter is a dichroic mirrored prism assembly which uses dichroic optical coatings to divide an incoming light beam into a number of spectrally distinct output beams. Such a device was used in three-pickup-tube color television cameras and the three-strip Technicolor movie camera. It is currently used in modern three-CCD cameras. An optically similar system is used in reverse as a beam-combiner in three-LCD projectors, in which light from three separate monochrome LCD displays is combined into a single full-color image for projection.

Beam splitters in PON networks are often made with single-mode optical fiber, by exploiting evanescent wave coupling between a pair of fibers to share the beam between them. The splitter is constructed by fusing together the two parallel bare fibers at one point.

Arrangements of mirrors or prisms used as camera attachments to photograph stereoscopic image pairs with one lens and one exposure are sometimes called "beam splitters", but that is a misnomer, as they are effectively a pair of periscopes redirecting rays of light which are already non-coincident. In some very uncommon attachments for stereoscopic photography, mirrors or prism blocks similar to beam splitters perform the opposite function, superimposing views of the subject from two different perspectives through color filters to allow the direct production of an anaglyph 3D image, or through rapidly alternating shutters to record sequential field 3D video.

== Phase shift ==
Phase shift through a beam splitter with a dielectric coating.

Beam splitters are sometimes used to recombine beams of light, as in a Mach–Zehnder interferometer. In this case there are two incoming beams, and potentially two outgoing beams. But the amplitudes of the two outgoing beams are the sums of the (complex) amplitudes calculated from each of the incoming beams, and it may result that one of the two outgoing beams has amplitude zero. In order for energy to be conserved (see next section), there must be a phase shift in at least one of the outgoing beams. For example (see red arrows in picture on the right), if a polarized light wave in air hits a dielectric surface such as glass, and the electric field of the light wave is in the plane of the surface, then the reflected wave will have a phase shift of π, while the transmitted wave will not have a phase shift; the blue arrow does not pick up a phase-shift, because it is reflected from a medium with a lower refractive index. The behavior is dictated by the Fresnel equations. This does not apply to partial reflection by conductive (metallic) coatings, where other phase shifts occur in all paths (reflected and transmitted). In any case, the details of the phase shifts depend on the type and geometry of the beam splitter.

== Classical lossless beam splitter ==
For beam splitters with two incoming beams, using a classical, lossless beam splitter with electric fields E_{a} and E_{b} each incident at one of the inputs, the two output fields E_{c} and E_{d} are linearly related to the inputs through

$$\mathbf{E}_\text{out} =
\begin{bmatrix} E_c \\ E_d \end{bmatrix} =
\begin{bmatrix} r_{ac}& t_{bc} \\  t_{ad}& r_{bd} \end{bmatrix}
\begin{bmatrix} E_a \\ E_b \end{bmatrix} =
\tau\mathbf{E}_\text{in},$$

where the 2×2 element $\tau$ is the beam-splitter transfer matrix and r and t are the reflectance and transmittance along a particular path through the beam splitter, that path being indicated by the subscripts. (The values depend on the polarization of the light.)

If the beam splitter removes no energy from the light beams, the total output energy can be equated with the total input energy, reading

$$|E_c|^2+|E_d|^2=|E_a|^2+|E_b|^2.$$

Inserting the results from the transfer equation above with $E_b=0$ produces

$$|r_{ac}|^2+|t_{ad}|^2=1,$$

and similarly for then $E_a=0$

$$|r_{bd}|^2+|t_{bc}|^2=1.$$

When both $E_a$ and $E_b$ are non-zero, and using these two results we obtain

$$r_{ac}t^{\ast}_{bc}+t_{ad}r^{\ast}_{bd}=0,$$

where "$^\ast$" indicates the complex conjugate. It is now easy to show that $\tau^\dagger\tau=\mathbf{I}$ where $\mathbf{I}$ is the identity, i.e. the beam-splitter transfer matrix is a unitary matrix.

Each r and t can be written as a complex number having an amplitude and phase factor; for instance, $r_{ac}=|r_{ac}|e^{i\phi_{ac}}$. The phase factor accounts for possible shifts in phase of a beam as it reflects or transmits at that surface. Then we obtain

$$|r_{ac}||t_{bc}|e^{i(\phi_{ac}-\phi_{bc})}+|t_{ad}||r_{bd}|e^{i(\phi_{ad}-\phi_{bd})}=0.$$

Further simplifying, the relationship becomes

$$\frac{|r_{ac}|}{|t_{ad}|}=-\frac{|r_{bd}|}{|t_{bc}|}e^{i(\phi_{ad}-\phi_{bd}+\phi_{bc}-\phi_{ac})}$$

which is true when $\phi_{ad}-\phi_{bd}+\phi_{bc}-\phi_{ac}=\pi$ and the exponential term reduces to -1. Applying this new condition and squaring both sides, it becomes

$$\frac{1-|t_{ad}|^2}{|t_{ad}|^2}=\frac{1-|t_{bc}|^2}{|t_{bc}|^2},$$

where substitutions of the form $|r_{ac}|^2=1-|t_{ad}|^2$ were made. This leads to the result

$$|t_{ad}|=|t_{bc}|\equiv T,$$

and similarly,

$$|r_{ac}|=|r_{bd}|\equiv R.$$

It follows that $R^2+T^2=1$.

Having determined the constraints describing a lossless beam splitter, the initial expression can be rewritten as

$$\begin{bmatrix} E_c \\ E_d \end{bmatrix} =
\begin{bmatrix} Re^{i\phi_{ac}}& Te^{i\phi_{bc}} \\  Te^{i\phi_{ad}}& Re^{i\phi_{bd}} \end{bmatrix}
\begin{bmatrix} E_a \\ E_b \end{bmatrix}.$$

Applying different values for the amplitudes and phases can account for many different forms of the beam splitter that can be seen widely used.

The transfer matrix appears to have 6 amplitude and phase parameters, but it also has 2 constraints: $R^2+T^2=1$ and $\phi_{ad}-\phi_{bd}+\phi_{bc}-\phi_{ac}=\pi$. To include the constraints and simplify to 4 independent parameters, we may write $\phi_{ad}=\phi_0+\phi_T, \phi_{bc}=\phi_0-\phi_T, \phi_{ac}=\phi_0+\phi_R$ (and from the constraint $\phi_{bd}=\phi_0-\phi_R-\pi$), so that

$$\begin{align}
\phi_T & = \tfrac{1}{2}\left(\phi_{ad} - \phi_{bc} \right)\\
\phi_R & = \tfrac{1}{2}\left(\phi_{ac} - \phi_{bd}  +\pi \right)\\
\phi_0 & = \tfrac{1}{2}\left(\phi_{ad} + \phi_{bc} \right)
\end{align}$$

where $2\phi_T$ is the phase difference between the transmitted beams and similarly for $2\phi_R$, and $\phi_0$ is a global phase. Lastly using the other constraint that $R^2+T^2=1$ we define $\theta = \arctan(R/T)$ so that $T=\cos\theta,R=\sin\theta$, hence

$$\tau=e^{i\phi_0}\begin{bmatrix}
\sin\theta e^{i\phi_R} & \cos\theta e^{-i\phi_T} \\
\cos\theta e^{i\phi_T} & -\sin\theta e^{-i\phi_R} \end{bmatrix}.$$

A 50:50 beam splitter is produced when $\theta=\pi/4$. The dielectric beam splitter above, for example, has

$$\tau=\frac{1}{\sqrt{2}}\begin{bmatrix}
1 & 1 \\
1 & -1 \end{bmatrix},$$

i.e. $\phi_T = \phi_R =\phi_0=0$, while the "symmetric" beam splitter of Loudon has

$$\tau=\frac{1}{\sqrt{2}}\begin{bmatrix}
1 & i \\
i & 1 \end{bmatrix},$$

i.e. $\phi_T = 0, \phi_R =-\pi/2, \phi_0=\pi/2$.

== Use in experiments ==
Beam splitters are core elements in a variety of thought experiments and real-world experiments in the areas of quantum theory and relativity theory and other fields of physics. These include:

- The Fizeau experiment of 1851 to measure the speeds of light in water
- The Michelson–Morley experiment of 1887 to measure the effect of the (hypothetical) luminiferous aether on the speed of light
- The Hammar experiment of 1935 to refute Dayton Miller's claim of a positive result from repetitions of the Michelson-Morley experiment
- The Kennedy–Thorndike experiment of 1932 to test the independence of the speed of light and the velocity of the measuring apparatus
- Bell test experiments (from ca. 1972) to demonstrate consequences of quantum entanglement and exclude local hidden-variable theories
- Wheeler's delayed choice experiment of 1978, 1984 etc., to test what makes a photon behave as a wave or a particle and when it happens
- The FELIX experiment (proposed in 2000) to test the Penrose interpretation that quantum superposition depends on spacetime curvature
- The Mach–Zehnder interferometer, used in various experiments, including the Elitzur–Vaidman bomb tester involving interaction-free measurement; and in others in the area of quantum computation
- Michelson interferometers, notably including the gravitational wave observatories LIGO, Virgo and KAGRA. The behavior of the beam splitter is core to the presence and reduction of noise due to vacuum fluctuations in LIGO, which injects a squeezed vacuum state into the empty input port of the beamsplitter to reduce coupling of quantum noise into the interferometer.

== Quantum mechanical description ==
In quantum mechanics, the electric fields are operators as explained by second quantization and Fock states. Each electrical field operator can further be expressed in terms of modes representing the wave behavior and amplitude operators, which are typically represented by the dimensionless creation and annihilation operators. In this theory, the four ports of the beam splitter are represented by a photon number state $|n\rangle$ and the action of a creation operation is $\hat{a}^\dagger|n\rangle=\sqrt{n+1}|n+1\rangle$. The following is a simplified version of Ref. The relation between the classical field amplitudes ${E}_{a},{E}_{b}, {E}_{c}$, and ${E}_{d}$ produced by the beam splitter is translated into the same relation of the corresponding quantum creation (or annihilation) operators $\hat{a}_a^\dagger,\hat{a}_b^\dagger, \hat{a}_c^\dagger$, and $\hat{a}_d^\dagger$, so that

$$\left(\begin{matrix}
\hat{a}_c^\dagger\\
\hat{a}_d^\dagger
\end{matrix}\right)= \tau
\left(\begin{matrix}
\hat{a}_a^\dagger\\
\hat{a}_b^\dagger
\end{matrix}\right)$$

where the transfer matrix is given in classical lossless beam splitter section above:

$$\tau=\left(\begin{matrix}
r_{ac} & t_{bc}\\
t_{ad} & r_{bd}
\end{matrix}\right)
=e^{i\phi_0}\left(\begin{matrix}
\sin\theta e^{i\phi_R} & \cos\theta e^{-i\phi_T} \\
\cos\theta e^{i\phi_T} & -\sin\theta e^{-i\phi_R} \end{matrix}\right).$$

Since $\tau$ is unitary, $\tau^{-1}=\tau^\dagger$, i.e.

$$\left(\begin{matrix}
\hat{a}_a^\dagger\\
\hat{a}_b^\dagger
\end{matrix}\right)=
\left(\begin{matrix}
r_{ac}^\ast & t_{ad}^\ast\\
t_{bc}^\ast & r_{bd}^\ast
\end{matrix}\right)
\left(\begin{matrix}
\hat{a}_c^\dagger\\
\hat{a}_d^\dagger
\end{matrix}\right).$$

This is equivalent to saying that if we start from the vacuum state $|00\rangle_{ab}$ and add a photon in port a to produce

$$|\psi_\text{in}\rangle=\hat{a}_a^\dagger|00\rangle_{ab}=|10\rangle_{ab},$$

then the beam splitter creates a superposition on the outputs of

$$|\psi_\text{out}\rangle=\left(r_{ac}^\ast\hat{a}_c^\dagger+t_{ad}^\ast\hat{a}_d^\dagger\right)|00\rangle_{cd}=r_{ac}^\ast|10\rangle_{cd}+t_{ad}^\ast|01\rangle_{cd}.$$

The probabilities for the photon to exit at ports c and d are therefore $|r_{ac}|^2$ and $|t_{ad}|^2$, as might be expected.

Likewise, for any input state $|nm\rangle_{ab}$

$$|\psi_\text{in}\rangle=|nm\rangle_{ab}
=\frac{1}{\sqrt{n!}}\left(\hat{a}_a^\dagger\right)^n\frac{1}{\sqrt{m!}}\left(\hat{a}_b^\dagger\right)^m|00\rangle_{ab}$$

and the output is

$$|\psi_\text{out}\rangle
=\frac{1}{\sqrt{n!}}
\left(r_{ac}^\ast\hat{a}_c^\dagger+t_{ad}^\ast\hat{a}_d^\dagger\right)^n
\frac{1}{\sqrt{m!}}
\left(t_{bc}^\ast\hat{a}_c^\dagger+r_{bd}^\ast\hat{a}_d^\dagger\right)^m
|00\rangle_{cd}.$$

Using the multi-binomial theorem, this can be written

$$\begin{align}
|\psi_\text{out}\rangle
&=\frac{1}{\sqrt{n!m!}} \sum_{j=0}^n \sum_{k=0}^m
\binom{n}{j}
\left(  r_{ac}^\ast \hat{a}_c^\dagger \right)^j \left( t_{ad}^\ast \hat{a}_d^\dagger \right) ^{(n-j)}
\binom{m}{k}
\left(  t_{bc}^\ast \hat{a}_c^\dagger \right)^k \left( r_{bd}^\ast \hat{a}_d^\dagger \right) ^{(m-k)}
|00\rangle_{cd}
\\
&=\frac{1}{\sqrt{n!m!}} \sum_{N=0}^{n+m}  \sum_{j=0}^N
\binom{n}{j}
r_{ac}^{\ast j}  t_{ad}^{\ast (n-j)}
\binom{m}{N-j}
t_{bc}^{\ast (N-j)} r_{bd}^{\ast (m-N+j)}
\left(\hat{a}_c^\dagger\right)^N
\left( \hat{a}_d^\dagger\right)^{M}|00\rangle_{cd}, \\
&=\frac{1}{\sqrt{n!m!}} \sum_{N=0}^{n+m}  \sum_{j=0}^N
\binom{n}{j}
\binom{m}{N-j}
r_{ac}^{\ast j}  t_{ad}^{\ast (n-j)} t_{bc}^{\ast (N-j)} r_{bd}^{\ast (m-N+j)}
\sqrt{N!M!} \quad |N,M\rangle_{cd},\end{align}$$

where $M=n+m-N$ and the $\tbinom{n}{j}$ is a binomial coefficient and it is to be understood that the coefficient is zero if $j\notin\{ 0,n \}$ etc.

The transmission/reflection coefficient factor in the last equation may be written in terms of the reduced parameters that ensure unitarity:

$$r_{ac}^{\ast j}  t_{ad}^{\ast (n-j)} t_{bc}^{\ast (N-j)} r_{bd}^{\ast (m-N+j)}
=(-1)^j\tan^{2j}\theta(-\tan\theta)^{m-N}\cos^{n+m}\theta\exp-i\left[(n+m)(\phi_0+\phi_T)-m(\phi_R+\phi_T)+N(\phi_R-\phi_T)\right].$$

where it can be seen that if the beam splitter is 50:50 then $\tan\theta=1$ and the only factor that depends on j is the $(-1)^j$ term. This factor causes interesting interference cancellations. For example, if $n=m$ and the beam splitter is 50:50, then

$$\begin{align}
\left(\hat{a}_a^\dagger\right)^n\left(\hat{a}_b^\dagger\right)^m
&\to \left[\hat{a}_a^\dagger\hat{a}_b^\dagger\right]^n \\
&=    \left[\left(r_{ac}^\ast\hat{a}_c^\dagger+t_{ad}^\ast\hat{a}_d^\dagger\right)
\left(t_{bc}^\ast\hat{a}_c^\dagger+r_{bd}^\ast\hat{a}_d^\dagger\right) \right]^n \\
&=    \left[\frac{e^{-i\phi_0}}{\sqrt{2}}\right]^{2n}
\left[\left(e^{-i\phi_R}\hat{a}_c^\dagger+e^{-i\phi_T}\hat{a}_d^\dagger\right)
\left(e^{i\phi_T}\hat{a}_c^\dagger-e^{i\phi_R}\hat{a}_d^\dagger\right) \right]^n \\
&=    \frac{e^{-2in\phi_0}}{2^n}\left[e^{i(\phi_T-\phi_R)} \left(\hat{a}_c^\dagger\right)^2
+e^{-i(\phi_T-\phi_R)}\left(\hat{a}_d^\dagger\right)^2 \right]^n
\end{align}$$

where the $\hat{a}_c^\dagger \hat{a}_d^\dagger$ term has cancelled. Therefore, the output states always have even numbers of photons in each arm. A famous example of this is the Hong–Ou–Mandel effect, in which the input has $n=m=1$, the output is always $|20\rangle_{cd}$ or $|02\rangle_{cd}$, i.e. the probability of output with a photon in each mode (a coincidence event) is zero. Note that this is true for all types of 50:50 beam splitter irrespective of the details of the phases, and the photons need only be indistinguishable. This contrasts with the classical result, in which equal output in both arms for equal inputs on a 50:50 beam splitter does appear for specific beam splitter phases (e.g. a symmetric beam splitter $\phi_0=\phi_T=0,\phi_R=\pi/2$), and for other phases where the output goes to one arm (e.g. the dielectric beam splitter $\phi_0=\phi_T=\phi_R=0$) the output is always in the same arm, not random in either arm as is the case here. From the correspondence principle we might expect the quantum results to tend to the classical one in the limits of large n, but the appearance of large numbers of indistinguishable photons at the input is a non-classical state that does not correspond to a classical field pattern, which instead produces a statistical mixture of different $|n,m\rangle$ known as Poissonian light.

Rigorous derivation is given in the Fearn–Loudon 1987 paper and extended in Ref to include statistical mixtures with the density matrix.

=== Non-symmetric beam-splitter ===
In general, for a non-symmetric beam-splitter, namely a beam-splitter for which the transmission and reflection coefficients are not equal, one can define an angle $\theta$ such that

$$\begin{cases}
|R| = \sin(\theta)\\
|T| = \cos(\theta)
\end{cases}$$

where $R$ and $T$ are the reflection and transmission coefficients. Then the unitary operation associated with the beam-splitter is then

$\hat{U}=e^{i\theta\left(\hat{a}_{a}^{\dagger}\hat{a}_{b}+\hat{a}_{a}\hat{a}_{b}^{\dagger}\right)}.$

=== Application for quantum computing ===
In 2000 Knill, Laflamme and Milburn (KLM protocol) proved that it is possible to create a universal quantum computer solely with beam splitters, phase shifters, photodetectors and single photon sources. The states that form a qubit in this protocol are the one-photon states of two modes, i.e. the states |01⟩ and |10⟩ in the occupation number representation (Fock state) of two modes. Using these resources it is possible to implement any single qubit gate and 2-qubit probabilistic gates. The beam splitter is an essential component in this scheme since it is the only one that creates entanglement between the Fock states.

Similar settings exist for continuous-variable quantum information processing. In fact, it is possible to simulate arbitrary Gaussian (Bogoliubov) transformations of a quantum state of light by means of beam splitters, phase shifters and photodetectors, given two-mode squeezed vacuum states are available as a prior resource only (this setting hence shares certain similarities with a Gaussian counterpart of the KLM protocol). The building block of this simulation procedure is the fact that a beam splitter is equivalent to a squeezing transformation under partial time reversal.

== Diffractive beam splitter ==
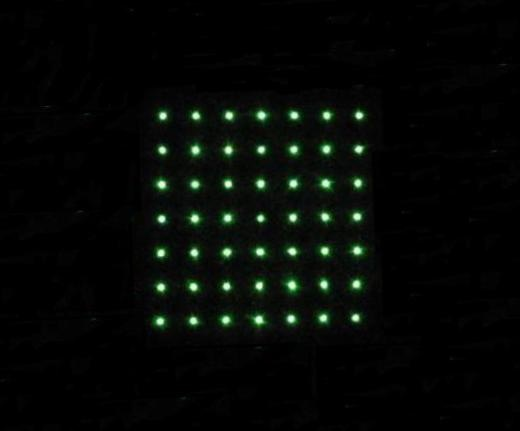
7x7 matrix using green laser and diffractive beam splitter.

The diffractive beam splitter (also known as multispot beam generator or array beam generator) is a single optical element that divides an input beam into multiple output beams. Each output beam retains the same optical characteristics as the input beam, such as size, polarization and phase. A diffractive beam splitter can generate either a 1-dimensional beam array (1xN) or a 2-dimensional beam matrix (MxN), depending on the diffractive pattern on the element. The diffractive beam splitter is used with monochromatic light such as a laser beam, and is designed for a specific wavelength and angle of separation between output beams.

== Reflection beam splitters ==
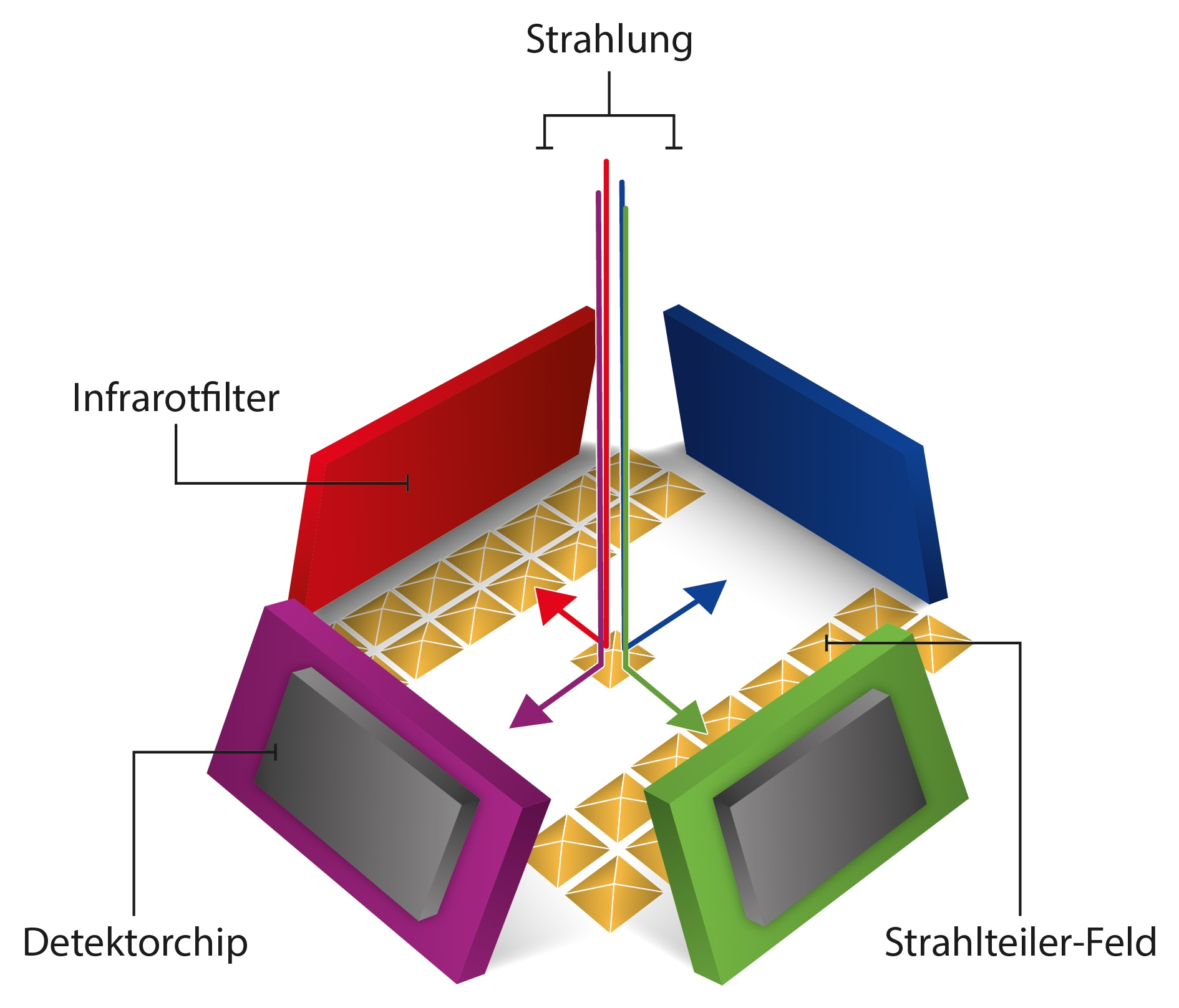
Principle drawing of a reflection beam splitter in a pyroelectric sensor (four optical channels)

Reflection beam splitters reflect parts of the incident radiation in different directions. These partial beams show exactly the same intensity. Typically, reflection beam splitters are made of metal and have a broadband spectral characteristic.

Due to their compact design, beam splitters of this type are particularly easy to install in infrared detectors. At this application, the radiation enters through the aperture opening of the detector and is split into several beams of equal intensity but different directions by internal highly reflective microstructures. Each beam hits a sensor element with an upstream optical filter. Particularly in NDIR gas analysis, this design enables measurement with only one beam with a minimal beam cross-section, which significantly increases the interference immunity of the measurement.

== See also ==
- Power dividers and directional couplers
