= Measurement problem =

Theoretical problem in quantum physics

In quantum mechanics, the measurement problem is the problem of definite outcomes: quantum systems have superpositions but quantum measurements only give one definite result.

The wave function in quantum mechanics evolves deterministically according to the Schrödinger equation as a linear superposition of different states. However, actual measurements always find the physical system in a definite state. Any future evolution of the wave function is based on the state the system was discovered to be in when the measurement was made, meaning that the measurement "did something" to the system that is not obviously a consequence of Schrödinger evolution. The measurement problem concerns what that "something" is, how a superposition of many possible values becomes a single measured value.

To express matters differently (paraphrasing Steven Weinberg), the Schrödinger equation determines the wave function at any later time. If observers and their measuring apparatus are themselves described by a deterministic wave function, why can we not predict precise results for measurements, but only probabilities? As a general question: How can one establish a correspondence between quantum reality and classical reality?

== Schrödinger's cat ==
A thought experiment called Schrödinger's cat illustrates the measurement problem. A mechanism is arranged to kill a cat if a quantum event, such as the decay of a radioactive atom, occurs. The mechanism and the cat are enclosed in a chamber so the fate of the cat is unknown until the chamber is opened. Prior to observation, according to quantum mechanics, the atom is in a quantum superposition, a linear combination of decayed and intact states. Also according to quantum mechanics, the atom-mechanism–cat composite system is described by superpositions of compound states. Therefore, the cat would be described as in a superposition, a linear combination of two states an "intact atom–alive cat" and a "decayed atom–dead cat". However, when the chamber is opened, the cat is either alive or it is dead: there is no superposition observed. After the measurement, the cat is definitively alive or dead.

The cat scenario illustrates the measurement problem: how can an indefinite superposition yield a single definite outcome? It also illustrates other issues in quantum measurement, including: When does a measurement occur? Was it when the cat was observed? How is a measurement apparatus defined? The mechanism for detecting radioactive decay? The cat? The chamber? What is the role of the observer?

== Interpretations ==
The views often grouped together as the Copenhagen interpretation are the oldest and, collectively, probably still the most widely held attitude about quantum mechanics. N. David Mermin coined the phrase "Shut up and calculate!" to summarize Copenhagen-type views, a saying often misattributed to Richard Feynman and which Mermin later found insufficiently nuanced.

Generally, views in the Copenhagen tradition posit that there is something in the act of observation which results in the collapse of the wave function. This concept, though often attributed to Niels Bohr, was due to Werner Heisenberg, whose later writings obscured many disagreements he and Bohr had during their collaboration and that the two never resolved. In these schools of thought, wave functions may be regarded as statistical information about a quantum system, and wave function collapse is the updating of that information in response to new data. Exactly how to understand this process remains a topic of dispute.

Bohr discussed his views in a 1947 letter to Pauli. Bohr points out that the measurement processes such as cloud chambers or photographic plates involve enormous amplification requiring energies far in excess of the quantum effects being studied and he notes that these processes are irreversible. He considered a consistent account of this issue to be an unsolved problem.

Hugh Everett's many-worlds interpretation attempts to solve the problem by suggesting that there is only one wave function, the superposition of the entire universe, and it never collapses—so there is no measurement problem. Instead, the act of measurement is simply an interaction between quantum entities, e.g. observer, measuring instrument, electron/positron etc., which entangle to form a single larger entity, for instance living cat/happy scientist. Everett also attempted to demonstrate how the probabilistic nature of quantum mechanics would appear in measurements, a work later extended by Bryce DeWitt. However, proponents of the Everettian program have not yet reached a consensus regarding the correct way to justify the use of the Born rule to calculate probabilities.

The de Broglie–Bohm theory tries to solve the measurement problem very differently: the information describing the system contains not only the wave function, but also supplementary data (a trajectory) giving the position of the particle(s). The role of the wave function is to generate the velocity field for the particles. These velocities are such that the probability distribution for the particle remains consistent with the predictions of the orthodox quantum mechanics. According to the de Broglie–Bohm theory, interaction with the environment during a measurement procedure separates the wave packets in configuration space, which is where apparent wave function collapse comes from, even though there is no actual collapse.

A fourth approach is given by objective-collapse models. In such models, the Schrödinger equation is modified and obtains nonlinear terms. These nonlinear modifications are of stochastic nature and lead to behaviour that for microscopic quantum objects, e.g. electrons or atoms, is unmeasurably close to that given by the usual Schrödinger equation. For macroscopic objects, however, the nonlinear modification becomes important and induces the collapse of the wave function. Objective-collapse models are effective theories. The stochastic modification is thought to stem from some external non-quantum field, but the nature of this field is unknown. One possible candidate is the gravitational interaction as in the models of Diósi and Penrose. The main difference of objective-collapse models compared to the other approaches is that they make falsifiable predictions that differ from standard quantum mechanics. Experiments are already getting close to the parameter regime where these predictions can be tested.

The Ghirardi–Rimini–Weber (GRW) theory proposes that wave function collapse happens spontaneously as part of the dynamics. Particles have a non-zero probability of undergoing a "hit", or spontaneous collapse of the wave function, on the order of once every hundred million years. Though collapse is extremely rare, the sheer number of particles in a measurement system means that the probability of a collapse occurring somewhere in the system is high. Since the entire measurement system is entangled (by quantum entanglement), the collapse of a single particle initiates the collapse of the entire measurement apparatus. Because the GRW theory makes different predictions from orthodox quantum mechanics in some conditions, it is not an interpretation of quantum mechanics in a strict sense.

== Role of decoherence ==
Erich Joos and Heinz-Dieter Zeh claim that the phenomenon of quantum decoherence, which was put on firm ground in the 1980s, resolves the problem. The idea is that the environment causes the classical appearance of macroscopic objects. Zeh further claims that decoherence makes it possible to identify the fuzzy boundary between the quantum microworld and the world where the classical intuition is applicable. Quantum decoherence becomes an important part of some modern updates of the Copenhagen interpretation based on consistent histories. Quantum decoherence does not describe the actual collapse of the wave function, but it explains the conversion of the quantum probabilities (that exhibit interference effects) to the ordinary classical probabilities. See, for example, Zurek, Zeh and Schlosshauer.

Schlosshauer described the status of these issues in a 2006 article as follows:

Several decoherence-unrelated proposals have been put forward in the past to elucidate the meaning of probabilities and arrive at the Born rule ... It is fair to say that no decisive conclusion appears to have been reached as to the success of these derivations. ...

As it is well known, [many papers by Bohr insist upon] the fundamental role of classical concepts. The experimental evidence for superpositions of macroscopically distinct states on increasingly large length scales counters such a dictum. Superpositions appear to be novel and individually existing states, often without any classical counterparts. Only the physical interactions between systems then determine a particular decomposition into classical states from the view of each particular system. Thus classical concepts are to be understood as locally emergent in a relative-state sense and should no longer claim a fundamental role in the physical theory.

== See also ==
For a more technical treatment of the mathematics involved in the topic, see Measurement in quantum mechanics.

- Absolute space and time
- Constructor theory
- Einstein's thought experiments
- EPR paradox
- Gleason's theorem
- Observer effect (physics)
- Observer (quantum physics)
- Philosophy of physics
- Quantum cognition
- Quantum pseudo-telepathy
- Quantum Zeno effect
- Wigner's friend
