= Gravitational decoherence =

Hypothetical mechanisms by which gravitation can cause quantum decoherence

Gravitational decoherence is a term for hypothetical mechanisms by which gravitation can act on quantum mechanical systems to produce decoherence. Advocates of gravitational decoherence include Frigyes Károlyházy, Roger Penrose and Lajos Diósi.

A number of experiments have been proposed to test the gravitational decoherence hypothesis.

Dmitriy Podolskiy and Robert Lanza have argued that gravitational decoherence may explain the existence of the arrow of time.

== See also ==
- Penrose interpretation
- Diósi–Penrose model
- Objective-collapse theory
- Quantum gravity
