= Observer (quantum physics) =

Concept in quantum mechanics

Some interpretations of quantum mechanics posit a central role for an observer of a quantum phenomenon. The quantum mechanical observer is tied to the issue of observer effect, where a measurement necessarily requires interacting with the physical object being measured, affecting its properties through the interaction. The term "observable" has gained a technical meaning, denoting a self-adjoint operator that represents the possible results of a random variable.

== Foundation ==
The theoretical foundation of the concept of measurement in quantum mechanics is a contentious issue deeply connected to the many interpretations of quantum mechanics. A key focus point is that of wave function collapse, for which several popular interpretations assert that measurement causes a discontinuous change into an eigenstate of the operator associated with the quantity that was measured, a change which is not time-reversible.

More explicitly, the superposition principle (ψ = Σ_{n}a_{n}ψ_{n}) of quantum physics dictates that for a wave function ψ, a measurement will result in a state of the quantum system of one of the m possible eigenvalues f_{n} , n = 1, 2, ..., m, of the operator which is in the space of the eigenfunctions ψ_{n} , n = 1, 2, ..., m.

Once one has measured the system, one knows its current state; and this prevents it from being in one of its other states — it has apparently decohered from them without prospects of future strong quantum interference. This means that the type of measurement one performs on the system affects the end-state of the system.

An experimentally studied situation related to this is the quantum Zeno effect, in which a quantum state would decay if left alone, but does not decay because of its continuous observation. The dynamics of a quantum system under continuous observation are described by a quantum stochastic master equation known as the Belavkin equation. Further studies have shown that even observing the results after the photon is produced leads to collapsing the wave function and loading a back-history as shown by delayed choice quantum eraser.

When discussing the wave function ψ which describes the state of a system in quantum mechanics, one should be cautious of a common misconception that assumes that the wave function ψ amounts to the same thing as the physical object it describes. This flawed concept must then require existence of an external mechanism, such as a measuring instrument, that lies outside the principles governing the time evolution of the wave function ψ, in order to account for the so-called "collapse of the wave function" after a measurement has been performed. But the wave function ψ is not a physical object like, for example, an atom, which has an observable mass, charge and spin, as well as internal degrees of freedom. Instead, ψ is an abstract mathematical function that contains all the statistical information that an observer can obtain from measurements of a given system. In this case, there is no real mystery in that this mathematical form of the wave function ψ must change abruptly after a measurement has been performed.

A consequence of Bell's theorem is that measurement on one of two entangled particles can appear to have a nonlocal effect on the other particle. Additional problems related to decoherence arise when the observer is modeled as a quantum system.

== Description ==
The Copenhagen interpretation, which is the most widely accepted interpretation of quantum mechanics among physicists, posits that an "observer" or a "measurement" is merely a physical process. One of the founders of the Copenhagen interpretation, Werner Heisenberg, wrote:

Of course the introduction of the observer must not be misunderstood to imply that some kind of subjective features are to be brought into the description of nature. The observer has, rather, only the function of registering decisions, i.e., processes in space and time, and it does not matter whether the observer is an apparatus or a human being; but the registration, i.e., the transition from the "possible" to the "actual," is absolutely necessary here and cannot be omitted from the interpretation of quantum theory.

Niels Bohr, also a founder of the Copenhagen interpretation, wrote:

all unambiguous information concerning atomic objects is derived from the permanent marks such as a spot on a photographic plate, caused by the impact of an electron left on the bodies which define the experimental conditions. Far from involving any special intricacy, the irreversible amplification effects on which the recording of the presence of atomic objects rests rather remind us of the essential irreversibility inherent in the very concept of observation. The description of atomic phenomena has in these respects a perfectly objective character, in the sense that no explicit reference is made to any individual observer and that therefore, with proper regard to relativistic exigencies, no ambiguity is involved in the communication of information.

Likewise, Asher Peres stated that "observers" in quantum physics are

similar to the ubiquitous "observers" who send and receive light signals in special relativity. Obviously, this terminology does not imply the actual presence of human beings. These fictitious physicists may as well be inanimate automata that can perform all the required tasks, if suitably programmed.

Critics of the special role of the observer also point out that observers can themselves be observed, leading to paradoxes such as that of Wigner's friend; and that it is not clear how much consciousness is required. As John Bell inquired, "Was the wave function waiting to jump for thousands of millions of years until a single-celled living creature appeared? Or did it have to wait a little longer for some highly qualified measurer—with a PhD?"

== Anthropocentric interpretation ==
The prominence of seemingly subjective or anthropocentric ideas like "observer" in the early development of the theory has been a continuing source of disquiet and philosophical dispute. A number of new-age religious or philosophical views give the observer a more special role, or place constraints on who or what can be an observer. As an example of such claims, Fritjof Capra declared, "The crucial feature of atomic physics is that the human observer is not only necessary to observe the properties of an object, but is necessary even to define these properties." There is no credible peer-reviewed research that backs such claims.

== Confusion with uncertainty principle ==
The uncertainty principle has been frequently confused with the observer effect, evidently even by its originator, Werner Heisenberg. In its standard form, the uncertainty principle describes an upper bound on the precision with which one can simultaneously measure a particle's position and momentum, with the consequence that, when operating at this limit, increasing the precision of the measurement of either quantity requires decreasing the precision of the measurement of the other.

An alternative version of the uncertainty principle, more in the spirit of an observer effect, fully accounts for the disturbance the observer has on a system and the error incurred, although this is not how the term "uncertainty principle" is most commonly used in practice.

== See also ==
- Observer effect (physics)
- Quantum foundations
