= Schrödinger's cat =

Thought experiment in quantum mechanics

Schrödinger's cat: a cat, a flask of poison, and a radioactive source connected to a Geiger counter are placed in a sealed box. As illustrated, the quantum description uses a superposition of a living cat and a deceased one.

In quantum mechanics, Schrödinger's cat is a thought experiment concerning quantum superposition. In the thought experiment, a hypothetical cat inside a closed box may be considered to be simultaneously both alive and dead while it is unobserved, as a result of its fate being linked to a random subatomic event that may or may not occur. This experiment, viewed this way, is described as a paradox. This thought experiment was devised by physicist Erwin Schrödinger in 1935, in a discussion with Albert Einstein, to illustrate what Schrödinger saw as the problems of Niels Bohr and Werner Heisenberg's philosophical views on quantum mechanics.

In Schrödinger's original formulation, a cat, a flask of poison, and a radioactive source are placed in a sealed box. If an internal radiation monitor such as a Geiger counter detects radioactivity (a single atom decaying), the flask is shattered, releasing the poison which kills the cat. If no decaying atom triggers the monitor, the cat remains alive. Mathematically, the wave function that describes the contents of the box is a combination, or quantum superposition, of these two possibilities. Yet, when one looks in the box, one sees the cat either alive or dead, not both alive and dead. This poses the question of when exactly quantum superposition ends and reality resolves into one possibility or the other.

Although originally a critique of Bohr and Heisenberg, Schrödinger's seemingly paradoxical thought experiment became part of the foundation of quantum mechanics. It is often featured in theoretical discussions of the interpretations of quantum mechanics, particularly in situations involving the measurement problem. As a result, Schrödinger's cat has had enduring appeal in popular culture. The experiment is not intended to be actually performed on a cat, but rather as an easily understandable illustration of the behavior of atoms. Experiments at the atomic scale have been carried out, showing that very small objects may exist as superpositions, but superposing an object as large as a cat would pose considerable technical difficulties.

Fundamentally, the Schrödinger's cat experiment asks how long quantum superpositions last and when (or whether) they collapse. Different interpretations of the mathematics of quantum mechanics have been proposed that give different explanations for this process.

== Origin and motivation ==
Unsolved problem in physics
How does the quantum description of reality, which includes elements such as the superposition of states and wavefunction collapse or quantum decoherence, give rise to the reality we perceive? Another way of stating this question regards the measurement problem: What constitutes a "measurement" that apparently causes the wave function to collapse into a definite state?
More unsolved problems in physics

Schrödinger intended his thought experiment as a discussion of the EPR article—named after its authors Einstein, Podolsky, and Rosen—in 1935. The EPR article highlighted the counterintuitive nature of quantum superpositions, in which a quantum system for two particles does not separate even when the particles are detected far from their last point of contact. The EPR paper concludes with a claim that this lack of separability meant that quantum mechanics as a theory of reality was incomplete.

Schrödinger and Einstein exchanged letters about Einstein's EPR article, in the course of which Einstein pointed out that the state of an unstable keg of gunpowder will, after a while, contain a superposition of both exploded and unexploded states. To further illustrate, Schrödinger described how one could, in principle, create a superposition in a large-scale system by making it dependent on a quantum particle that was in a superposition. He proposed a scenario with a cat in a closed steel chamber, wherein the cat's life or death depended on the state of a radioactive atom, whether it had decayed and emitted radiation or not. According to Schrödinger, the position taken by Bohr and Heisenberg would be that the cat remains both alive and dead until the state has been observed. Schrödinger did not wish to promote the idea of dead-and-live cats as a serious possibility; on the contrary, he intended the example to illustrate the absurdity of the existing view of quantum mechanics, thus employing reductio ad absurdum.

Since Schrödinger's time, various interpretations of the mathematics of quantum mechanics have been advanced by physicists, some of which regard the "alive and dead" cat superposition as quite real, while others do not. Intended as a critique of ideas prevalent in 1935, the Schrödinger's cat thought experiment remains a touchstone for modern interpretations of quantum mechanics and can be used to illustrate and compare their strengths and weaknesses.

== Thought experiment ==
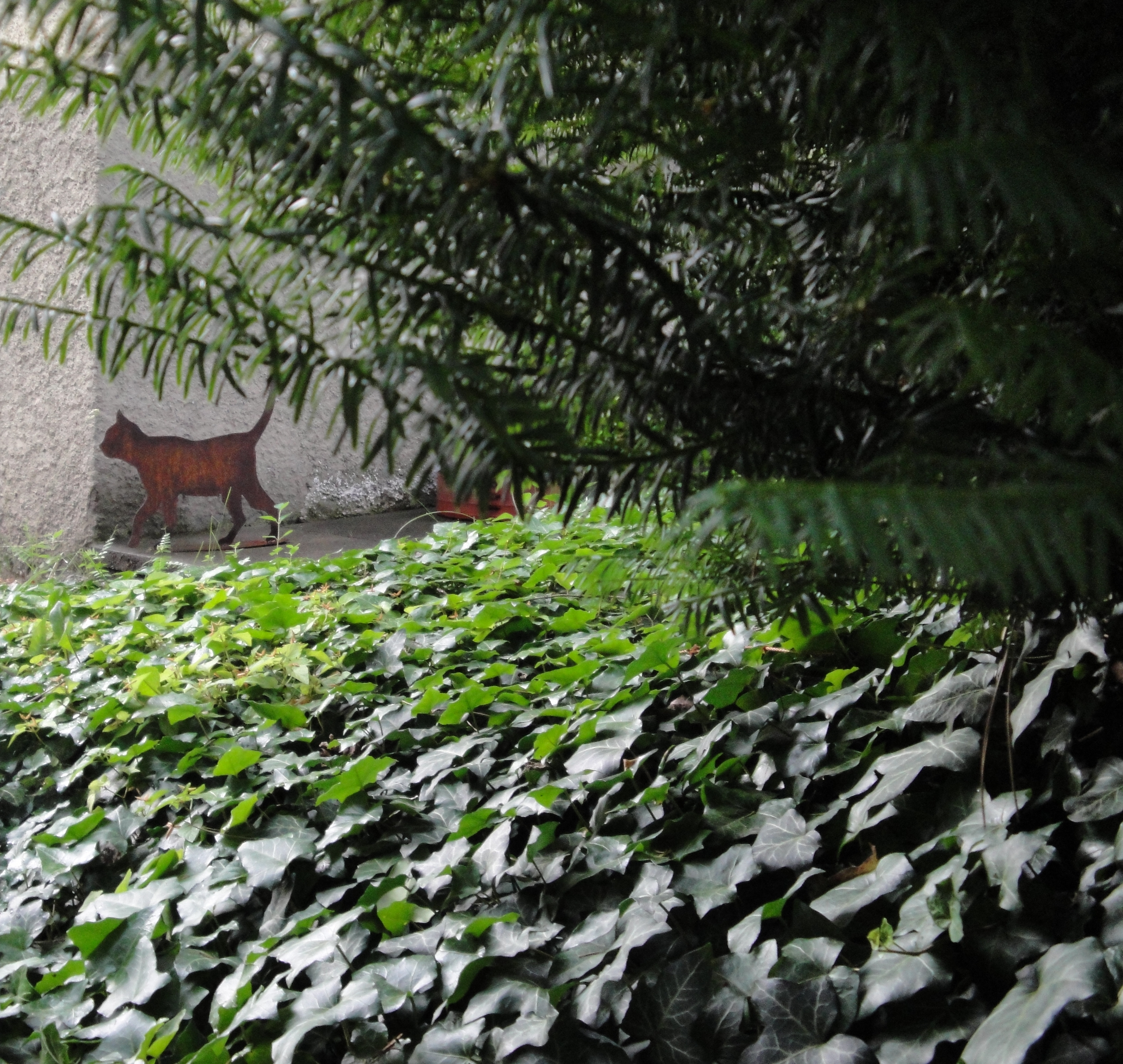
A life-size cat figure in the garden of Huttenstrasse 9, Zurich, where Erwin Schrödinger lived from 1921 to 1926. Depending on the light conditions, the figure appears to be either a live cat or a dead one.

Schrödinger wrote:

One can contrive even completely burlesque [farcical] cases. A cat is put in a steel chamber along with the following infernal device (which must be secured against direct interference by the cat): in a Geiger counter, there is a tiny amount of radioactive substance, so tiny that in the course of an hour one of the atoms will perhaps decay, but also, with equal probability, that none of them will; if it does happen, the counter tube will discharge and through a relay release a hammer that will shatter a small flask of hydrocyanic acid. If one has left this entire system to itself for an hour, one would tell oneself that the cat is still alive if no atom has decayed in the meantime. Even a single atomic decay would have poisoned it. The psi-function of the entire system would express this by having in it the living and dead cat (pardon the expression) mixed or spread out in equal parts.

It is typical of these cases that an indeterminacy originally restricted to the atomic domain turns into a sensually observable [macroscopic] indeterminacy, which can then be resolved by direct observation. This prevents us from so naïvely accepting a "blurred model" as representative of reality. Per se, it would not embody anything unclear or contradictory. There is a difference between a shaky or out-of-focus photograph and a snapshot of clouds and fog banks.

Schrödinger developed his famous thought experiment in correspondence with Einstein. He suggested this 'quite ridiculous case' to illustrate his conclusion that the wave function cannot represent reality. The wave function description of the complete cat system implies that the reality of the cat mixes the living and dead cat. Einstein was impressed by the ability of the thought experiment to highlight these issues. In a letter to Schrödinger dated 1950, he wrote:

You are the only contemporary physicist, besides Laue, who sees that one cannot get around the assumption of reality, if only one is honest. Most of them simply do not see what sort of risky game they are playing with reality—reality as something independent of what is experimentally established. Their interpretation is, however, refuted most elegantly by your system of radioactive atom + amplifier + charge of gun powder + cat in a box, in which the psi-function of the system contains both the cat alive and blown to bits. Nobody really doubts that the presence or absence of the cat is something independent of the act of observation.

The charge of gunpowder is not mentioned in Schrödinger's setup, which uses a Geiger counter as an amplifier and hydrocyanic poison instead of gunpowder. The gunpowder had been mentioned in Einstein's original suggestion to Schrödinger 15 years before, and Einstein carried it forward to the present discussion.

== Analysis ==
In modern terms Schrödinger's hypothetical cat experiment describes the measurement problem: quantum theory describes the cat system as a combination of two possible outcomes but only one outcome is ever observed. The experiment poses the question, "when does a quantum system stop existing as a superposition of states and become one or the other?" (More technically, when does the actual quantum state stop being a non-trivial linear combination of states, each of which resembles different classical states, and instead begin to have a unique classical description?) Standard microscopic quantum mechanics describes multiple possible outcomes of experiments but only one outcome is observed. The thought experiment illustrates this apparent paradox. Our intuition says that the cat cannot be in more than one state simultaneously—yet the quantum mechanical description of the thought experiment requires such a condition.

== Interpretations ==
Since Schrödinger's time, other interpretations of quantum mechanics have been proposed that give different answers to the questions posed by Schrödinger's cat of how long superpositions last and when (or whether) they collapse.

=== Copenhagen interpretation ===
A commonly held interpretation of quantum mechanics is the Copenhagen interpretation. In the Copenhagen interpretation, a measurement results in only one state of a superposition. This thought experiment makes apparent the fact that this interpretation simply provides no explanation for the state of the cat while the box is closed. The wavefunction description of the system consists of a superposition of the states "decayed nucleus/dead cat" and "undecayed nucleus/living cat". Only when the box is opened and observed can we make a statement about the cat.

=== Role of consciousness ===
In 1932, John von Neumann described in his book Mathematical Foundations of Quantum Mechanics a pattern where the radioactive source is observed by a device, which itself is observed by another device and so on. It makes no difference in the predictions of quantum theory where along this chain of causal effects the superposition collapses. This potentially infinite chain could be broken if the last device is replaced by a conscious observer. This solved the problem because it was claimed that an individual's consciousness cannot be multiple. Eugene Wigner asserted that an observer is necessary for a collapse to one or the other (e.g., either a live cat or a dead cat) of the terms on the right-hand side of a wave function. Wigner discussed the interpretation in a thought experiment known as Wigner's friend. Wigner supposed that a friend opened the box and observed the cat without telling anyone. From Wigner's conscious perspective, the friend is now part of the wave function and has seen a live cat and seen a dead cat. To a third person's conscious perspective, Wigner himself becomes part of the wave function once Wigner learns the outcome from the friend. This could be extended indefinitely.

A resolution of the paradox is that the triggering of the Geiger counter counts as a measurement of the state of the radioactive substance. Because a measurement has already occurred deciding the state of the cat, the subsequent observation by a human records only what has already occurred. Analysis of an actual experiment by Roger Carpenter and A. J. Anderson found that measurement alone (for example by a Geiger counter) is sufficient to collapse a quantum wave function before any human knows of the result. The apparatus indicates one of two colors depending on the outcome. The human observer sees which color is indicated, but does not consciously know which outcome the color represents. A second human, the one who set up the apparatus, is told of the color and becomes conscious of the outcome, and the box is opened to check if the outcome matches. However, it is disputed whether merely observing the color counts as a conscious observation of the outcome.

=== Bohr's interpretation ===
Analysis of the work of Niels Bohr, one of the main scientists associated with the Copenhagen interpretation, suggests he viewed the state of the cat before the box is opened as indeterminate. The superposition itself had no physical meaning to Bohr: Schrödinger's cat would be either dead or alive long before the box is opened but the cat and box form an inseparable combination. Bohr saw no role for a human observer. Bohr emphasized the classical nature of measurement results. An "irreversible" or effectively irreversible process imparts the classical behavior of "observation" or "measurement".

=== Many-worlds interpretation ===
The quantum-mechanical "Schrödinger's cat" paradox according to the many-worlds interpretation. In this interpretation, every event is a branch point. The cat is both alive and dead—regardless of whether the box is opened—but the "alive" and "dead" cats are in different branches of the universe that are equally real but cannot interact with each other.

In 1957, Hugh Everett formulated the many-worlds interpretation of quantum mechanics, which does not single out observation as a special process. In the many-worlds interpretation, both alive and dead states of the cat persist after the box is opened, but are decoherent from each other. In other words, when the box is opened, the observer and the possibly-dead cat split into an observer looking at a box with a dead cat and an observer looking at a box with a live cat. But since the dead and alive states are decoherent, there is no communication or interaction between them.

When opening the box, the observer becomes entangled with the cat, so "observer states" corresponding to the cat's being alive and dead are formed; each observer state is entangled, or linked, with the cat so that the observation of the cat's state and the cat's state correspond with each other. Quantum decoherence ensures that the different outcomes have no interaction with each other. Decoherence is generally considered to prevent simultaneous observation of multiple states.

A variant of the Schrödinger's cat experiment, known as the quantum suicide machine, has been proposed by cosmologist Max Tegmark. It examines the Schrödinger's cat experiment from the point of view of the cat, and argues that by using this approach, one may be able to distinguish between the Copenhagen interpretation and many-worlds.

=== Ensemble interpretation ===
In ensemble interpretations, superpositions are sub-ensembles of a larger statistical ensemble. The state vector would not apply to individual cat experiments, but only to the statistics of many similarly prepared cat experiments. Proponents of these interpretations argue that this makes the Schrödinger's cat paradox a trivial matter, or a non-issue. When the physicist opens the box, they simply discover which subensemble that specific cat belonged to.

=== Relational interpretation ===
The relational interpretation makes no fundamental distinction between the human experimenter, the cat, and the apparatus or between animate and inanimate systems; all are quantum systems governed by the same rules of wavefunction evolution, and all may be considered "observers". But the relational interpretation allows that different observers can give different accounts of the same series of events, depending on the information they have about the system. The cat can be considered an observer of the apparatus; meanwhile, the experimenter can be considered another observer of the system in the box (the cat plus the apparatus). Before the box is opened, the cat, by nature of its being alive or dead, has information about the state of the apparatus (the atom has either decayed or not decayed); but the experimenter does not have information about the state of the box contents. In this way, the two observers simultaneously have different accounts of the situation: To the cat, the wavefunction of the apparatus has appeared to "collapse"; to the experimenter, the contents of the box appear to be in superposition. Not until the box is opened, and both observers have the same information about what happened, do both system states appear to "collapse" into the same definite result, a cat that is either alive or dead.

=== Transactional interpretation ===
In the transactional interpretation the apparatus emits an advanced wave backward in time, which combined with the wave that the source emits forward in time, forms a standing wave. The waves are seen as physically real, and the apparatus is considered an "observer". In the transactional interpretation, the collapse of the wavefunction is "atemporal" and occurs along the whole transaction between the source and the apparatus. The cat is never in superposition. Rather the cat is only in one state at any particular time, regardless of when the human experimenter looks in the box. The transactional interpretation resolves this quantum paradox.

=== Objective collapse theories ===
According to objective collapse theories, superpositions are destroyed spontaneously (irrespective of external observation) when some objective physical threshold (of time, mass, temperature, irreversibility, etc.) is reached. Thus, the cat would be expected to have settled into a definite state long before the box is opened. This could loosely be phrased as "the cat observes itself" or "the environment observes the cat".

Objective collapse theories require a modification of standard quantum mechanics to allow superpositions to be destroyed by the process of time evolution. These theories could ideally be tested by creating mesoscopic superposition states in the experiment. For instance, energy cat states have been proposed as a precise detector of the quantum gravity related energy decoherence models.

== Applications and tests ==
Schrödinger's cat quantum superposition of states and effect of the environment through decoherence

The experiment as described is a purely theoretical one, and the machine proposed is not known to have been constructed. However, successful experiments involving similar principles, e.g. superpositions of relatively large (by the standards of quantum physics) objects have been performed. These experiments do not show that a cat-sized object can be superposed, but the known upper limit on "cat states" has been pushed upwards by them. In many cases the state is short-lived, even when cooled to near absolute zero.

- A "cat state" has been achieved with photons.
- A beryllium ion has been trapped in a superposed state.
- An experiment involving a superconducting quantum interference device ("SQUID") has been linked to the theme of the thought experiment: "The superposition state does not correspond to a billion electrons flowing one way and a billion others flowing the other way. Superconducting electrons move en masse. All the superconducting electrons in the SQUID flow both ways around the loop at once when they are in the Schrödinger's cat state."
- A piezoelectric "tuning fork" has been constructed, which can be placed into a superposition of vibrating and non vibrating states. The resonator comprises about 10 trillion atoms.
- An experiment involving a flu virus has been proposed.
- An experiment involving a bacterium and an electromechanical oscillator has been proposed.

In quantum computing the phrase "cat state" sometimes refers to the GHZ state, wherein several qubits are in an equal superposition of all being 0 and all being 1; e.g.,
$$| \psi \rangle = \frac{1}{\sqrt{2}} \bigg( | 00\ldots0 \rangle + |11\ldots1 \rangle \bigg).$$

According to at least one proposal, it may be possible to determine the state of the cat before observing it.

== In popular culture ==
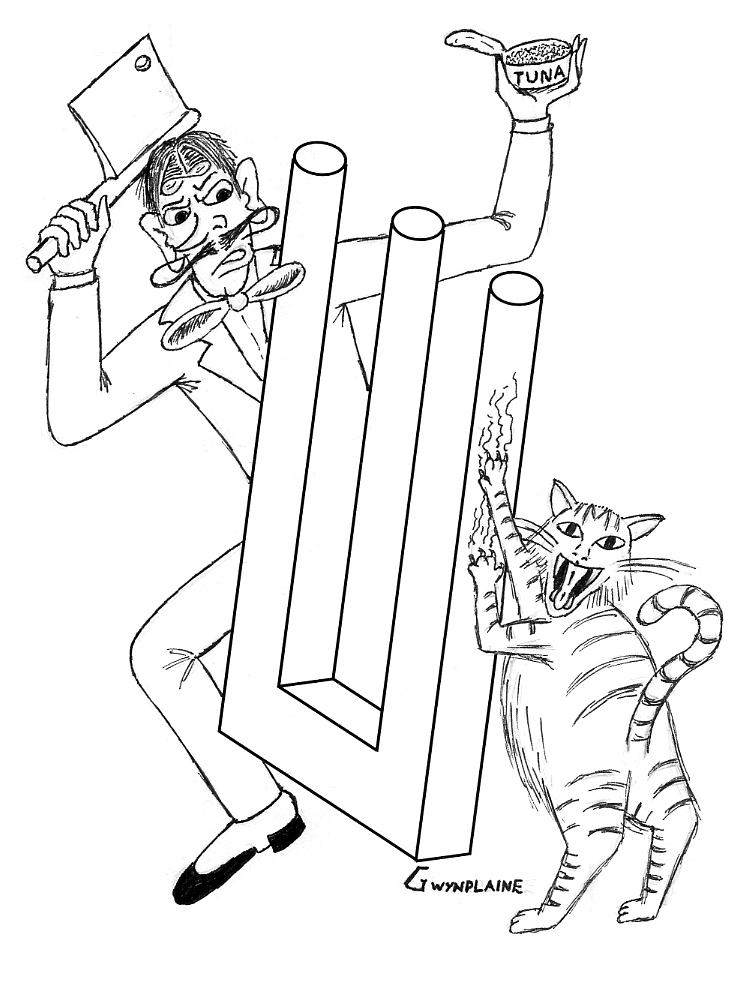
This drawing by F. Gwynplaine MacIntyre, originally published in Analog magazine, illustrates MacIntyre's science-fiction story "Schrödinger's Cat-Sitter". The cat is depicted simultaneously in front of and behind the impossible trident in an optical illusion.

According to historian of science Robert P. Crease, Schrödinger's thought experiment did not become widely known until the 1970s. In 1972 Ursula K. Le Guin learned about it while researching quantum mechanics for her novel The Dispossessed; Crease credits her 1974 short story "Schrödinger's Cat" with bringing the concept into popular culture. Other science-fiction writers soon picked it up, often using it in a humorous vein. Works of fiction have employed Schrödinger's thought experiment as plot device and as metaphor, in genres from apocalyptic science fiction to young-adult drama, making the cat more prominent in popular culture than in physics itself.

Schrödinger's cat has been a motive in many science fiction works, and used as a title of a number of them, including Greg Bear's "Schrödinger's Plague" (Analog, 29 March 1982), George Alec Effinger's "Schrödinger's Kitten" (Omni, September 1988), F. Gwynplaine MacIntyre's "Schrödinger's Cat-Sitter" (Analog, July/August 2001), Rudy Rucker's "Schrödinger's Cat" (Analog, 30 March 1981), and Robert Anton Wilson's Schrödinger's Cat Trilogy (1988), illustrating various interpretations of quantum physics. In addition to novels and short stories, Schrödinger's cat has appeared in film, poetry, theatre, live-action television, cartoons, music, and webcomics.

== See also ==
- Basis function
- Cat state
- Complementarity (physics)
- Double-slit experiment
- Elitzur–Vaidman bomb tester
- Heisenberg cut
- Modal realism
- Observer effect (physics)
- Ray cat
- Schroedinbug
