= Penrose interpretation =

Interpretation of quantum mechanics

The Penrose interpretation is a speculation by Roger Penrose about the relationship between quantum mechanics and general relativity. Penrose proposes that a quantum state remains in superposition until the difference of space-time curvature attains a significant level.

== Overview ==
Penrose's idea is inspired by quantum gravity because it uses both the physical constants $\hbar$ and $G$. It is an alternative to the Copenhagen interpretation which posits that superposition fails when an observation is made (but that it is non-objective in nature), and the many-worlds interpretation, which states that alternative outcomes of a superposition are equally "real," while their mutual decoherence precludes subsequent observable interactions.

Penrose's idea is a type of objective collapse theory. For these theories, the wavefunction is a physical wave, which experiences wave function collapse as a physical process, with observers not having any special role. Penrose theorises that the wave function cannot be sustained in superposition beyond a certain energy difference between the quantum states. He gives an approximate value for this difference: a Planck mass worth of matter, which he calls the "'one-graviton' level". He then hypothesizes that this energy difference causes the wave function to collapse to a single state, with a probability based on its amplitude in the original wave function, a procedure derived from standard quantum mechanics. Penrose's "'one-graviton' level" criterion forms the basis of his prediction, providing an objective criterion for wave function collapse. Despite the difficulties of specifying this in a rigorous way, he proposes that the basis states into which the collapse takes place are mathematically described by the stationary solutions of the Schrödinger–Newton equation. Recent theoretical work indicates an increasingly deep inter-relation between quantum mechanics and gravitation.

== Physical consequences ==
Accepting that wave functions are physically real, Penrose believes that matter can exist in more than one place at one time. In his opinion, a macroscopic system, like a human being, cannot exist in more than one place for a measurable time, as the corresponding energy difference is very large. A microscopic system, like an electron, can exist in more than one location significantly longer (thousands of years), until its space-time curvature separation reaches collapse threshold.

In Einstein's theory, any object that has mass causes a warp in the structure of space and time around it. This warping produces the effect we experience as gravity. Penrose points out that tiny objects, such as dust specks, atoms and electrons, produce space-time warps as well. Ignoring these warps is where most physicists go awry. If a dust speck is in two locations at the same time, each one should create its own distortions in space-time, yielding two superposed gravitational fields. According to Penrose's theory, it takes energy to sustain these dual fields. The stability of a system depends on the amount of energy involved: the higher the energy required to sustain a system, the less stable it is. Over time, an unstable system tends to settle back to its simplest, lowest-energy state: in this case, one object in one location producing one gravitational field. If Penrose is right, gravity yanks objects back into a single location, without any need to invoke observers or parallel universes.

Penrose speculates that the transition between macroscopic and quantum states begins at the scale of dust particles (the mass of which is close to a Planck mass). He has proposed an experiment to test this theory, called FELIX (free-orbit experiment with laser interferometry X-rays), in which an X-ray laser in space is directed toward a tiny mirror and fissioned by a beam splitter from tens of thousands of miles away, with which the photons are directed toward other mirrors and reflected back. One photon will strike the tiny mirror while moving to another mirror and move the tiny mirror back as it returns, and according to conventional quantum theories, the tiny mirror can exist in superposition for a significant period of time. This would prevent any photons from reaching the detector. If Penrose's hypothesis is correct, the mirror's superposition will collapse to one location in about a second, allowing half the photons to reach the detector.

However, because this experiment would be difficult to arrange, a table-top version that uses optical cavities to trap the photons long enough for achieving the desired delay has been proposed instead.

== See also ==
- Diósi–Penrose model
- Gravitational decoherence
- Interpretations of quantum mechanics
- Orchestrated objective reduction
- Schrödinger–Newton equation
- Stochastic quantum mechanics

Relevant books by Roger Penrose

- The Emperor's New Mind
- The Road to Reality
- Shadows of the Mind
