= Frigyes Károlyházy =

Hungarian theoretical physicist

Frigyes Károlyházy (Hungarian: Károlyházy Frigyes) (Budapest, 28 December 1929 - Budapest, 2 July 2012) was a Hungarian theoretical physicist, textbook writer and university professor. He was an extremely talented teacher, trying to make complex physical problems understandable to the laity as well.

== Education ==
Károlyházy graduated from the Piarista Gimnázium in Budapest in 1948, and then was admitted to the mathematics and physics teaching department of Eötvös Loránd University . He was admitted to the Eötvös Collegium at the same time as the university, and was expelled after a year due to the political situation in the country (he refused to support the conviction of László Rajk). There was no theoretical physics training in Hungary at that time, so he applied here, and then a few years later, when he had the opportunity, he re-enrolled in the research physics department. He graduated from the university in 1952 with a doctorate twenty years later, in 1972in. Visiting Fellow, University of North Carolina at Chapel Hill (USA, 1964), visiting fellow, University of Chile, Santiago (1970). He spent his long stays abroad with the highest level of support from party state bodies, traveling with a diplomatic passport of special status.

== Work ==
The topic of his doctoral thesis and research was the relationship between quantum physics and general relativity. Károlyházy tried to examine this from a new perspective, from the perspective of combining quantum theory and gravity. He achieved significant results in the field of relativistic space theory, giving a new model to the so-called Mach principle to install. He was interested in coherence and superposition in quantum theory, and his valuable work is to extend the issue of coherence to complex systems to the macroscopic level.

Károlyházy later researched the possibilities of utilizing electrogas dynamics generators. His name is associated with the initiation of a trend that did not see quantum mechanical randomness as a measurement process as an external intervention, but as an integral part of temporal evolution that is constantly modifying the Schrödinger equation. His work has attracted the attention of world-renowned researchers such as Richard Feynman, Jenő Wigner and Roger Penrose.

Károlyházy was one of the original proponents of the idea of gravitational decoherence.
