= Observer effect (physics) =

Fact that observing a situation changes it

In physics, the observer effect is the disturbance of a system by the act of observation. This is often the result of utilizing instruments that, by necessity, alter the state of what they measure in some manner. A common example is checking the pressure in an automobile tire, which causes some of the air to escape, thereby changing the amount of pressure one observes. Similarly, seeing non-luminous objects requires light hitting the object to cause it to reflect that light. While the effects of observation are often negligible, the object still experiences a change. This effect can be found in many domains of physics, but can usually be reduced to insignificance by using various instruments or observation techniques.

A notable example of the observer effect occurs in quantum mechanics, as demonstrated by the double-slit experiment. Physicists have found that observation of quantum phenomena by a detector or an instrument can change the measured results of this experiment. Despite the "observer effect" in the double-slit experiment being caused by the presence of an electronic detector, the experiment's results have been interpreted by some to suggest that a conscious mind can directly affect reality. However, the need for the "observer" to be conscious is not supported by scientific research, and has been pointed out as a misconception rooted in a poor understanding of the quantum wave function ψ and the quantum measurement process.

== Particle physics ==
To "observe a particle" means to gain information about one of its physical properties (such as its position, momentum, energy, or spin) by having it interact with a measuring device.

A free particle is a particle that experiences no external forces (interactions), so its momentum remains constant. In contrast, an electron interacting with a photon will inevitably alter the momentum and/or position of both particles when the electron and photon collide, thus resulting in a transfer of energy between them. Therefore the act of observing an electron changes the state it is in.

Even when the measurement does not involve a collision, such as by observing its electric field or magnetic field, it will alter its wave-function and therefore alter its momentum and/or position.

It is also necessary to distinguish clearly between the measured value of a quantity and the value resulting from the measurement process. A formula (one-dimensional for simplicity) relating involved quantities, derived from Niels Bohr's 1928 paper "The Quantum Postulate and the Recent Development of Atomic Theory", is given by the following formula:
$$|v'_x - v_x|\Delta p_x \approx \hbar/\Delta t,$$
where

- Δp_{x} is uncertainty in measured value of momentum,
- Δt is duration of measurement,
- v_{x} is velocity of particle before measurement,
- v′_{x} is velocity of particle after measurement,
- ħ is the reduced Planck constant.
- This formula is related to the Heisenberg uncertainty principle.

The measured momentum of the electron is then related to v_{x}, whereas its momentum after the measurement is related to v′_{x}. This is a best-case scenario showing how the measurement (or observation) changes the mathematical answer to the equation.

== Electronics ==
In electronics, ammeters and voltmeters are usually wired in series or parallel to the circuit, and so by their very presence affect the current or the voltage they are measuring by way of presenting an additional real or complex load to the circuit, thus changing the transfer function and behavior of the circuit itself. Even a more passive device such as a current clamp, which measures the wire current without coming into physical contact with the wire, affects the current through the circuit being measured because the inductance is mutual.

== Thermodynamics ==
In thermodynamics, a standard mercury-in-glass thermometer must absorb or give up some thermal energy to record a temperature, and therefore changes the temperature of the body which it is measuring.

== Quantum mechanics ==
Some interpretations of quantum mechanics posit a central role for an observer of a quantum phenomenon. The quantum mechanical observer is tied to the issue of observer effect, where a measurement necessarily requires interacting with the physical object being measured, affecting its properties through the interaction. The term "observable" has gained a technical meaning, denoting a self-adjoint operator that represents the possible results of a random variable.

== See also ==
- Observer (special relativity)
