= Objective-collapse theory =

Interpretation of quantum mechanics

Objective-collapse theories, also known as spontaneous collapse models or dynamical reduction models, are proposed solutions to the measurement problem in quantum mechanics. As with other interpretations of quantum mechanics, they are possible explanations of why and how quantum measurements always give definite outcomes, not a superposition of them as predicted by the Schrödinger equation, and more generally how the classical world emerges from quantum theory. The fundamental idea is that the unitary evolution of the wave function describing the state of a quantum system is approximate. It works well for microscopic systems, but progressively loses its validity when the mass / complexity of the system increases.

In collapse theories, the Schrödinger equation is supplemented with additional nonlinear and stochastic terms (spontaneous collapses) which localize the wave function in space. The resulting dynamics is such that for microscopic isolated systems, the new terms have a negligible effect; therefore, the usual quantum properties are recovered, apart from very tiny deviations. Such deviations can potentially be detected in dedicated experiments, and efforts are increasing worldwide towards testing them.

An inbuilt amplification mechanism makes sure that for macroscopic systems consisting of many particles, the collapse becomes stronger than the quantum dynamics. Then their wave function is always well-localized in space, so well-localized that it behaves, for all practical purposes, like a point moving in space according to Newton's laws.

In this sense, collapse models provide a unified description of microscopic and macroscopic systems, avoiding the conceptual problems associated to measurements in quantum theory.

The most well-known examples of such theories are:

- Ghirardi–Rimini–Weber (GRW) model
- Continuous spontaneous localization (CSL) model
- Diósi–Penrose (DP) model

Collapse theories stand in opposition to many-worlds interpretation theories, in that they hold that a process of wave function collapse curtails the branching of the wave function and removes unobserved behaviour.

== History of collapse theories ==
Philip Pearle's 1976 paper pioneered the quantum nonlinear stochastic equations to model the collapse of the wave function in a dynamical way; this formalism was later used for the CSL model. However, these models lacked the character of "universality" of the dynamics, i.e. its applicability to an arbitrary physical system (at least at the non-relativistic level), a necessary condition for any model to become a viable option.

The next major advance came in 1986, when Ghirardi, Rimini and Weber published the paper with the meaningful title "Unified dynamics for microscopic and macroscopic systems", where they presented what is now known as the GRW model, after the initials of the authors. The model has two guiding principles:

1. The position basis states are used in the dynamic state reduction (the "preferred basis" is position);
2. The modification must reduce superpositions for macroscopic objects without altering the microscopic predictions.

In 1990 the efforts for the GRW group on one side, and of P. Pearle on the other side, were brought together in formulating the Continuous Spontaneous Localization (CSL) model, where the Schrödinger dynamics and a randomly fluctuating classical field produce collapse into spatially localized eigenstates.

In the late 1980s and 1990s, Diosi and Penrose and others independently formulated the idea that the wave function collapse is related to gravity. The dynamical equation is structurally similar to the CSL equation.

== Most popular models ==
Three models are most widely discussed in the literature:

- Ghirardi–Rimini–Weber (GRW) model: It is assumed that each constituent of a physical system independently undergoes spontaneous collapses. The collapses are random in time, distributed according to a Poisson distribution; they are random in space and are more likely to occur where the wave function is larger. In between collapses, the wave function evolves according to the Schrödinger equation. For composite systems, the collapse on each constituent causes the collapse of the center of mass wave functions.
- Continuous spontaneous localization (CSL) model: The Schrödinger equation is supplemented with a nonlinear and stochastic diffusion process driven by a suitably chosen universal noise coupled to the mass-density of the system, which counteracts the quantum spread of the wave function. As for the GRW model, the larger the system, the stronger the collapse, thus explaining the quantum-to-classical transition as a progressive breakdown of quantum linearity, when the system's mass increases. The CSL model is formulated in terms of identical particles.
- Diósi–Penrose (DP) model: Diósi and Penrose formulated the idea that gravity is responsible for the collapse of the wave function. Penrose argued that, in a quantum gravity scenario where a spatial superposition creates the superposition of two different spacetime curvatures, gravity does not tolerate such superpositions and spontaneously collapses them. He also provided a phenomenological formula for the collapse time. Independently and prior to Penrose, Diósi presented a dynamical model that collapses the wave function with the same time scale suggested by Penrose.

The Quantum Mechanics with Universal Position Localization (QMUPL) model should also be mentioned; an extension of the GRW model for identical particles formulated by Tumulka, which proves several important mathematical results regarding the collapse equations.

In all models listed so far, the noise responsible for the collapse is Markovian (memoryless): either a Poisson process in the discrete GRW model, or a white noise in the continuous models. The models can be generalized to include arbitrary (colored) noises, possibly with a frequency cutoff: the CSL model has been extended to its colored version (cCSL), as well as the QMUPL model (cQMUPL). In these new models the collapse properties remain basically unaltered, but specific physical predictions can change significantly.

In all collapse models, the noise effect must prevent quantum mechanical linearity and unitarity and thus cannot be described within quantum-mechanics. Because the noise responsible for the collapse induces Brownian motion on each constituent of a physical system, energy is not conserved. The kinetic energy increases at a constant rate. Such a feature can be modified, without altering the collapse properties, by including appropriate dissipative effects in the dynamics. This is achieved for the GRW, CSL, QMUPL and DP models, obtaining their dissipative counterparts (dGRW, dCSL, dQMUPL, DP). The QMUPL model has been further generalized to include both colored noise as well as dissipative effects (dcQMUPL model).

== Tests of collapse models ==
Collapse models modify the Schrödinger equation; therefore, they make predictions that differ from standard quantum mechanical predictions. Although the deviations are difficult to detect, there is a growing number of experiments searching for spontaneous collapse effects. They can be classified in two groups:

- Interferometric experiments. They are refined versions of the double-slit experiment, showing the wave nature of matter (and light). The modern versions are meant to increase the mass of the system, the time of flight, and/or the delocalization distance in order to create ever larger superpositions. The most prominent experiments of this kind are with atoms, molecules and phonons.
- Non-interferometric experiments. They are based on the fact that the collapse noise, besides collapsing the wave function, also induces a diffusion on top of particles' motion, which acts always, also when the wave function is already localized. Experiments of this kind involve cold atoms, opto-mechanical systems, gravitational wave detectors, underground experiments.

== Problems and criticisms to collapse theories ==
=== Violation of the principle of the conservation of energy ===
According to collapse theories, energy is not conserved, also for isolated particles. More precisely, in the GRW, CSL and DP models the kinetic energy increases at a constant rate, which is small but non-zero.

This is often presented as an unavoidable consequence of Heisenberg's uncertainty principle: the collapse in position causes a larger uncertainty in momentum. This explanation is wrong; in collapse theories the collapse in position also determines a localization in momentum, driving the wave function to an almost minimum uncertainty state both in position and in momentum, compatibly with Heisenberg's principle. The reason the energy increases is that the collapse noise diffuses the particle, thus accelerating it.

This is the same situation as in classical Brownian motion, and similarly this increase can be stopped by adding dissipative effects. Dissipative versions of the QMUPL, GRW, CSL and DP models exist, where the collapse properties are left unaltered with respect to the original models, while the energy thermalizes to a finite value (therefore it can even decrease, depending on its initial value).

Still, in the dissipative model the energy is not strictly conserved. A resolution to this situation might come by considering the noise to also be a dynamical variable with its own energy, which is exchanged with the quantum system in such a way that the energy of the total system and noise together is conserved.

=== Relativistic collapse models ===
One of the biggest challenges in collapse theories is to make them compatible with relativistic requirements. The GRW, CSL and DP models are not. The biggest difficulty is how to combine the nonlocal character of the collapse, which is necessary in order to make it compatible with the experimentally verified violation of Bell inequalities, with the relativistic principle of locality. Models exist that attempt to generalize in a relativistic sense the GRW and CSL models, but their status as relativistic theories is still unclear. The formulation of a proper Lorentz-covariant theory of continuous objective collapse is still a matter of research.

=== Tails problem ===
In all collapse theories, the wave function is never fully contained within one (small) region of space, because the Schrödinger term of the dynamics will always spread it outside. Therefore, wave functions always contain tails stretching out to infinity, although their "weight" is smaller in larger systems. Critics of collapse theories argue that it is not clear how to interpret these tails. Two distinct problems have been discussed in the literature. The first is the "bare" tails problem: it is not clear how to interpret these tails because they amount to the system never being really fully localized in space. A special case of this problem is known as the "counting anomaly". Supporters of collapse theories mostly dismiss this criticism as a misunderstanding of the theory, as in the context of dynamical collapse theories, the absolute square of the wave function is interpreted as an actual matter density. In this case, the tails merely represent an immeasurably small amount of smeared-out matter. This leads into the second problem, however, the so-called "structured tails problem": it is not clear how to interpret these tails because even though their "amount of matter" is small, that matter is structured like a perfectly legitimate world. Thus, after the box is opened and Schroedinger's cat has collapsed to the "alive" state, there still exists a tail of the wavefunction containing "low matter" entity structured like a dead cat. Collapse theorists have offered a range of possible solutions to the structured tails problem, but it remains an open problem.

== See also ==
- Interpretation of quantum mechanics
- Many-worlds interpretation
- Philosophy of information
- Philosophy of physics
- Quantum information
- Quantum entanglement
- Coherence (physics)
- Quantum decoherence
- EPR paradox
- Quantum Zeno effect
- Measurement problem
- Measurement in quantum mechanics
- Wave function collapse
- Quantum gravity
