= Kramers' law (disambiguation) =

Kramers' law describes the spectral distribution of X-ray emissions.

Kramers' law may also refer to:

- Kramers' opacity law describing opacity in terms of density and temperature
- Kramers theorem about degeneracy and time-reversal symmetry

== See also ==
- Cramer's rule for solving simultaneous linear equations
- Cramér's theorem (disambiguation)
