= Aurora Tumino =

Italian nuclear astrophysicist

Aurora Tumino is an Italian nuclear astrophysicist whose research studies the reaction rates, cross sections, and S-factors of different types of nuclear fusion in the cores of stars, including the carbon-burning process, and the effects of these rates on the chemical evolution of stars. She is a professor at the Kore University of Enna in Sicily and head of the research division of the Istituto Nazionale di Fisica Nucleare (INFN) Laboratori Nazionali del Sud.

== Education and career ==
Tumino was a student at the University of Catania, where she received a laurea in 1995 and completed her Ph.D. in 2000. Since 1994 she has been an associated researcher with the Istituto Nazionale di Fisica Nucleare (INFN), since 2014 a researcher with the INFN Laboratori Nazionali del Sud in Catania, and since 2021 the head of the laboratory's research division.

She was a postdoctoral researched as an Alexander von Humboldt Post Doctoral Fellow at the Helmholtz-Zentrum Berlin for Materials and Energy, working there with Wolfram von Oertzen. Next, she became a researcher at the University of Catania from 2001 to 2007, and at the Kore University of Enna from 2008 to 2011. In 2011, she became an associate professor at the Kore University of Enna, and in 2014 she became a full professor there.

== Recognition ==
Tumino was named as a Fellow of the American Physical Society (APS) in 2025, after a nomination from the APS Forum on International Physics, "for leading pioneering efforts in the study of stellar evolution through indirect methods in nuclear astrophysics, conducted at nuclear research facilities across all continents, thereby advancing our global understanding of the origin and evolution of the elements in the universe".

She received the 2019 Giovan Pietro Grimaldi Prize of the Grimaldi Foundation, and the 2020 Ulixes Prize of Città dei Mosaici (Piazza Armerina).
