= Landé interval rule =

Rule in atomic physics

In atomic physics, the Landé interval rule states that, due to weak angular momentum coupling (either spin-orbit or spin-spin coupling), the energy splitting between successive sub-levels are proportional to the total angular momentum quantum number (J or F) of the sub-level with the larger of their total angular momentum value (J or F).

== Background ==
The rule assumes the Russell–Saunders coupling and that interactions between spin magnetic moments can be ignored. The latter is an incorrect assumption for light atoms. As a result of this, the rule is optimally followed by atoms with medium atomic numbers.

The rule was first stated in 1923 by German-American physicist Alfred Landé.

== Derivation ==
As an example, consider an atom with two valence electrons and their fine structures in the LS-coupling scheme. We will derive heuristically the interval rule for the LS-coupling scheme and will remark on the similarity that leads to the interval rule for the hyperfine structure.

The interactions between electrons couple their orbital and spin angular momentums. Let's denote the spin and orbital angular momentum as $\mathbf{s}$ and $\mathbf{l}$ for each electrons. Thus, the total orbital angular momentum is $\mathbf{L} = \mathbf{l}_1 + \mathbf{l}_2$ and total spin momentum is $\mathbf{S} = \mathbf{s}_1 + \mathbf{s}_2$. Then the coupling in the LS-scheme gives rise to a Hamiltonian:

$H_{\mathrm{s}-\mathrm{o}}=\beta_{1} \mathbf{s}_{1} \cdot \mathbf{l}_{1}+\beta_{2} \mathbf{s}_{2} \cdot \mathbf{l}_{2}$

where $\beta_1$ and $\beta_2$ encode the strength of the coupling. The Hamiltonian $H_{\mathrm{s}-\mathrm{o}}$ acts as a perturbation to the state $\vert L m_L S m_S \rangle$ . The coupling would cause the total orbital $\mathbf{L}$ and spin $\mathbf{S}$ angular momentums to change directions, but the total angular momentum $\mathbf{J} = \mathbf{L} + \mathbf{S}$ would remain constant. Its z-component $J_z$ would also remain constant, since there is no external torque acting on the system. Therefore, we shall change the state to $\vert L m_L J m_J \rangle$, which is a linear combination of various $\vert L m_L S m_S \rangle$. The exact linear combination, however, is unnecessary to determine the energy shift.

To study this perturbation, we consider the vector model where we treat each $\mathbf{l}$ as a vector. $\mathbf{l}_1$ and $\mathbf{l}_2$ precesses around the total orbital angular momentum $\mathbf{L}$ . Consequently, the component perpendicular to $\mathbf{L}$ averages to zero over time, and thus only the component along $\mathbf{L}$ needs to be considered. That is, $\mathbf{l}_{1} \rightarrow\left[\left(\overline{\mathbf{l}_{1} \cdot \mathbf{L}}\right) /|\mathbf{L}|^{2}\right] \mathbf{L}$ . We replace $|\mathbf{L}|^{2}$ by $L(L+1)$ and $\left(\overline{\mathbf{l}_{1} \cdot \mathbf{L}}\right)$ by the expectation value $\left\langle\mathbf{l}_{1} \cdot \mathbf{L}\right\rangle$.

Applying this change to all the terms in the Hamiltonian, we can rewrite it as

$$\begin{aligned}
H_{\mathrm{s}-\mathrm{o}} &=\beta_{1} \frac{\left\langle\mathbf{s}_{1} \cdot \mathbf{S}\right\rangle}{S(S+1)} \mathbf{S} \cdot \frac{\left\langle\mathbf{l}_{1} \cdot \mathbf{L}\right\rangle}{L(L+1)} \mathbf{L}+\beta_{2} \frac{\left\langle\mathbf{s}_{2} \cdot \mathbf{S}\right\rangle}{S(S+1)} \mathbf{S} \cdot \frac{\left\langle\mathbf{l}_{2} \cdot \mathbf{L}\right\rangle}{L(L+1)} \mathbf{L} \\
&=\beta_{L S} \mathbf{S} \cdot \mathbf{L}
\end{aligned}$$

The energy shift is then

$E_{\mathrm{s}-\mathrm{o}}=\beta_{L S}\langle\mathbf{S} \cdot \mathbf{L}\rangle.$

Now we can apply the substitution $\mathbf{L} \cdot \mathbf{S}=(\mathbf{J} \cdot \mathbf{J}-\mathbf{L} \cdot \mathbf{L}-\mathbf{S} \cdot \mathbf{S}) / 2$ to write the energy as

$E_{\mathrm{s}-\mathrm{o}}=\frac{\beta_{L S}}{2}\{J(J+1)-L(L+1)-S(S+1)\}.$

Consequently, the energy interval between adjacent $J$ sub-levels is:

$\Delta E_{\mathrm{FS}}=E_{J}-E_{J-1}=\beta_{L S} J$

This is the Landé interval rule.

As an example, consider a ${}^3P$ term, which has 3 sub-levels ${ }^{3} \mathrm{P}_{0},{ }^{3} \mathrm{P}_{1},{ }^{3} \mathrm{P}_{2}$ . The separation between $J = 2$ and $J = 1$ is $2 \beta$ , twice as the separation between $J = 1$ and $J = 0$ is $\beta$ .

As for the spin-spin interaction responsible for the hyperfine structure, because the Hamiltonian of the hyperfine interaction can be written as

$H_{HFS} = A_{HFS} \mathbf{I} \cdot \mathbf{J}$

where $\mathbf{I}$ is the nuclear spin and $\mathbf{J}$ is the total angular momentum, we also have an interval rule:

$E_{F}-E_{F-1}= A_{HFS} F$

where $F$ is the total angular momentum $\mathbf{F} = \mathbf{I} + \mathbf{J}$ . The derivation is essentially the same, but with nuclear spin $\mathbf{I}$ , angular momentum $\mathbf{J}$ and total angular momentum $\mathbf{F}$ .

== Limitations ==
The interval rule holds when the coupling is weak. In the LS-coupling scheme, a weak coupling means the energy of spin-orbit coupling $E_{s-o}$ is smaller than residual electrostatic interaction: $E_{s-o} \ll E_{re}$. Here the residual electrostatic interaction refers to the term including electron-electron interaction after we employ the central field approximation to the Hamiltonian of the atom. For the hyperfine structure, the interval rule for two magnetic moments can be disrupted by magnetic quadruple interaction between them, so we want $A \gg \Delta E_{\text {Quadrupole }}$.

For example, in helium, the spin-spin interactions and spin-other-orbit interaction have an energy comparable to that of the spin-orbit interaction.
