= Central Field =

Central Field may refer to:

- Central Field (Central State), former home of the Central State College Bronchos football team, now the University of Central Oklahoma
- Central Field (Iwo Jima), a World War II airfield on Iwo Jima, Japan
- Central Field, Giza, an archaeological site in Egypt

== See also ==
- Central field approximation
