= Paul Humphreys (disambiguation) =

Paul Humphreys (born 1960) is a British musician

Paul Humphreys may also refer to:

- Paul Humphreys (philosopher) (1950–2022)
- Paul Humphreys (bluegrass musician)

== See also ==
- Paul Humphries (born 1965), former English cricketer
- Paul Humphrey (disambiguation)
