= Propensity probability =

Interpretation of probability

The propensity theory of probability is a probability interpretation in which the probability is thought of as a physical propensity, disposition, or tendency of a given type of situation to yield an outcome of a certain kind, or to yield a long-run relative frequency of such an outcome.

Propensities are not relative frequencies, but purported causes of the observed stable relative frequencies. Propensities are invoked to explain why repeating a certain kind of experiment will generate a given outcome type at a persistent rate. Stable long-run frequencies are a manifestation of invariant single-case probabilities. Frequentists are unable to take this approach, since relative frequencies do not exist for single tosses of a coin, but only for large ensembles or collectives. These single-case probabilities are known as propensities or chances.

In addition to explaining the emergence of stable relative frequencies, the idea of propensity is motivated by the desire to make sense of single-case probability attributions in quantum mechanics, such as the probability of decay of a particular atom at a particular moment.

== History ==
A propensity theory of probability was given by Charles Sanders Peirce.

=== Karl Popper ===
A later propensity theory was proposed by philosopher Karl Popper, who had only slight acquaintance with the writings of Charles S. Peirce, however. Popper noted that the outcome of a physical experiment is produced by a certain set of "generating conditions". When we repeat an experiment, as the saying goes, we really perform another experiment with a (more or less) similar set of generating conditions. To say that a set of generating conditions G has propensity p of producing the outcome E means that those exact conditions, if repeated indefinitely, would produce an outcome sequence in which E occurred with limiting relative frequency p. Thus the propensity p for E to occur depends upon G:$Pr(E, G)=p$. For Popper then, a deterministic experiment would have propensity 0 or 1 for each outcome, since those generating conditions would have the same outcome on each trial. In other words, non-trivial propensities (those that differ from 0 and 1) imply something less than determinism and yet still causal dependence on the generating conditions.

=== Recent work ===
A number of other philosophers, including David Miller and Donald A. Gillies, have proposed propensity theories somewhat similar to Popper's, in that propensities are defined in terms of either long-run or infinitely long-run relative frequencies.

Other propensity theorists (e.g. Ronald Giere) do not explicitly define propensities at all, but rather see propensity as defined by the theoretical role it plays in science. They argue, for example, that physical magnitudes such as electrical charge cannot be explicitly defined either, in terms of more basic things, but only in terms of what they do (such as attracting and repelling other electrical charges). In a similar way, propensity is whatever fills the various roles that physical probability plays in science.

Other theories have been offered by D. H. Mellor, and Ian Hacking.

Ballentine developed an axiomatic propensity theory building on the work of Paul Humphreys. They show that the causal nature of the condition in propensity conflicts with an axiom needed for Bayes' theorem.

==== Principal principle of David Lewis ====
What roles does physical probability play in science? What are its properties? One central property of chance is that, when known, it constrains rational belief to take the same numerical value. David Lewis called this the principal principle, The principle states:

- The Principal Principle. Let C be any reasonable initial credence function. Let t be any time. Let x be any real number in the unit interval. Let X be the proposition that the chance, at time t, of A's holding equals x. Let E be any proposition compatible with X that is admissible at time t. Then C(AIXE) = x.

Thus, for example, suppose you are certain that a particular biased coin has propensity 0.32 to land heads every time it is tossed. What is then the correct credence? According to the Principal Principle, the correct credence is .32.

== See also ==
- Bayesian probability
- Frequentism
