= William Duane (physicist) =

American physicist (1872–1935)

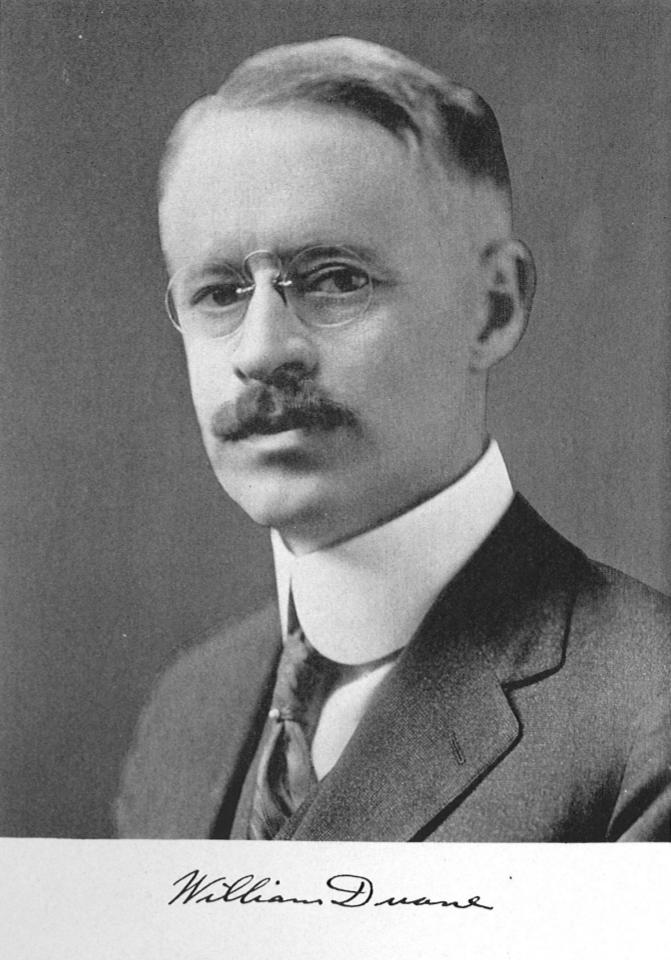
- Born: February 17, 1872; Philadelphia, Pennsylvania, U.S.
- Died: March 7, 1935 (aged 63); Devon, Pennsylvania, U.S.
- Resting place: Laurel Hill Cemetery, Philadelphia, Pennsylvania, U.S.
- Education: University of Pennsylvania; Harvard University; University of Berlin
- Known for: Duane-Hunt law Duane's hypothesis
- Awards: John Scott Medal (1922); Comstock Prize in Physics (1922); Leonard Prize of the American Roentgen Ray Society (1923)
- Scientific career
- Fields: Physics; Biophysics
- Workplaces: University of Colorado Boulder; University of Paris; Harvard University
- Doctoral advisor: Walther Nernst

William Duane (February 17, 1872 – March 7, 1935) was an American physicist who conducted research on radioactivity and X-rays and their usage in the treatment of cancer. He developed the Duane-Hunt Law and Duane's hypothesis. He worked with Pierre and Marie Curie in their University of Paris laboratory for six years and developed a method for generating quantities of radon-222 "seeds" from radium for usage in early forms of brachytherapy.

He was a professor at the University of Colorado Boulder, professor-emeritus and chair of biophysics at Harvard University and research fellow of physics at the Harvard Cancer Commission. He received the John Scott Medal and the Comstock Prize in Physics in 1922 and the Leonard Prize of the American Roentgen Ray Society in 1923.

== Early life and education ==
Duane was born in Philadelphia, Pennsylvania, to Charles William and Emma Cushman (Lincoln) Duane. He was a direct descendant of Benjamin Franklin from his father's side.

He received an A.B. degree in mathematics from the University of Pennsylvania in 1892 and was valedictorian of his class. He studied at Harvard University and graduated with an A.B. in 1893. He worked as an assistant to John Trowbridge in his research on Hertzian waves and received an A.M. degree in 1895.

He received a Tyndall Fellowship from Harvard and conducted research on electromagnetism under Emil Warburg at the University of Berlin. His doctoral advisor was Walter Nernst from the University of Gottingen. Duane received his doctorate degree from the University of Berlin after his dissertation Uber elektrolytische Thermoketten was accepted by Max Planck.

== Academic career ==
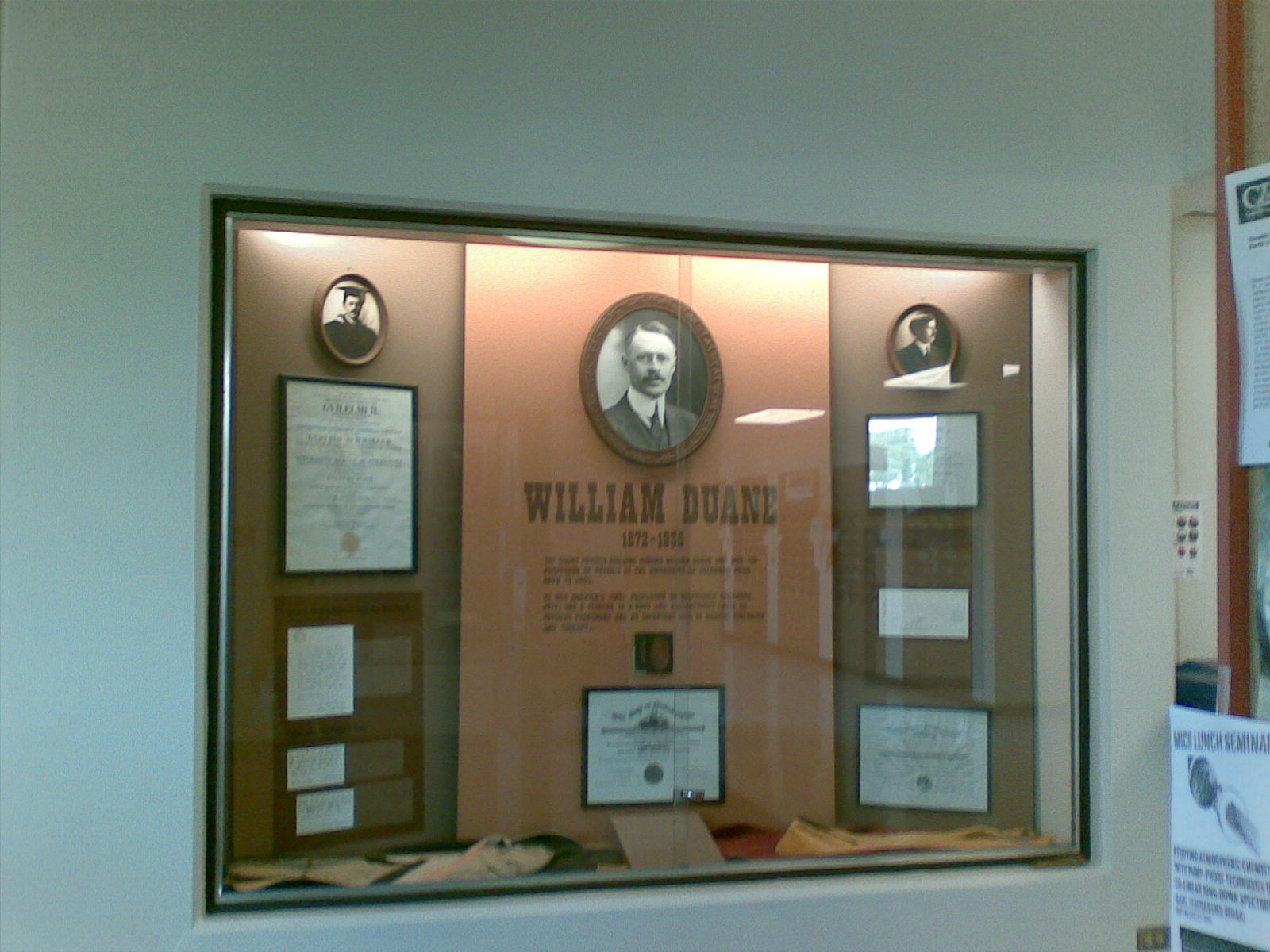
Display about Duane at the University of Colorado Boulder

He worked as a professor of physics at the University of Colorado Boulder from 1898 to 1907. He spent a one-year sabbatical with Pierre and Marie Curie in their radium research laboratory at the University of Paris in 1906 and was then invited to work with them from 1907 to 1912. He published 17 scientific papers during this time mostly around the properties of X-rays from radioactive sources and the measurement of heat generated from radioactive disintegration. Although none of the papers were in direct collaboration with the Curies, he worked closely with them and it was reported that when Marie Curie visited America years later, she stated that she most wanted to see "Niagara Falls, The Grand Canyon and William Duane"

Duane refined a technique for extracting radon-222 gas from radium sulfate solutions. Solutions containing 1 gram of radium were "milked" to create radon "seeds" of about 20 millicuries each. These "seeds" were distributed throughout Paris for use in endocurietherapy. Duane perfected this "milking" technique during his time in Paris and referred to the device as a "radium cow".

He returned to the United States in 1913 and worked in a joint role as assistant professor of physics at Harvard and Research Fellow in Physics of the Harvard Cancer Commission. The Cancer Commission was founded in 1901 and hired Duane to investigate the usage of radium emanations in the treatment of cancer. In 1915 he built Boston's first "radium cow" and thousands of patients were treated with the radon-222 generated from it. He published eight papers on the technical details of using radioactive material and X-Rays in the treatment of cancer. In 1917, Harvard created the chair of bio-physics for him.

Duane made important contributions to the technical details of measuring X-ray dosage in terms of the ionization of air. He conducted research to determine the structure of matter and on the mechanism of radiation. He developed the Duane-Hunt law, relating the minimum wavelength of X-rays to the threshold voltage of the cathode rays that excite them; and Duane's hypothesis of quantized translative momentum transfer.

In May 1923, Arthur Compton demonstrated that the momentum of X-ray photons explained the scattering of X-rays by electrons, an effect now known as Compton Scattering. Initially, Duane could not reproduce Compton's results and led an effort to prove that Compton's interpretation was incorrect. In late 1923 Duane carried out a series of experiments to disprove Compton, but ultimately found evidence that Compton was correct. In late 1924, Duane conceded that this was the case.

He served as councillor of the Societe de Physique from 1920 to 1923, as chairman of the division of physical sciences of the National Research Council from 1922 to 1923, as president of the Society for Cancer Research in 1923 and as vice president of section B of the American Association for the Advancement of Science from 1927 to 1928.

After his retirement from Harvard in 1934, he was awarded the title professor of biophysics emeritus.

== Death ==
Starting in 1925, Duane began suffering a continual decline in health brought on by diabetes. He died on March 7, 1935, due to a second paralytic stroke. He was interred at Laurel Hill Cemetery in Philadelphia, Pennsylvania.

== Honours and awards ==
Duane was elected to the American Academy of Arts and Sciences in 1914. In 1920, he was elected to the American Philosophical Society. He received the John Scott Medal and the Comstock Prize in Physics from the National Academy of Sciences, of which he was a member, in 1922. He received the Leonard Prize of the American Roentgen Ray Society in 1923.

He was awarded honorary Sc.D degrees from the University of Pennsylvania in 1922 and the University of Colorado Boulder in 1923.

In 1971, the physics department building at the University of Colorado Boulder was named in his honor.

== Selected publications ==
- Duane, William (1905). "Sur l'ionisation de l'air en présence de l'émanation du radium". Journal de Physique Théorique et Appliquée. 4 (1): 605–619. doi:10.1051/jphystap:019050040060500. ISSN 0368-3893.
- Duane, William (1905). "Sur l'ionization produite entre les plateaux paralleles par l'émanation du radium". Comptes rendus de l'Académie des Sciences. 140: 786–788.
- Duane, William; Hunt, Franklin L. (1915). "On X-Ray Wave-Lengths". Physical Review. 6 (2): 166–172. Bibcode:1915PhRv....6..166.. doi:10.1103/PhysRev.6.166.
- Duane, William (1915). "On the Extraction and Purification of Radium Emanation". Physical Review. 5 (4): 311–314. Bibcode:1915PhRv....5..311D. doi:10.1103/PhysRev.5.311. ISSN 0031-899X.
