= Kramers' opacity law =

Optical law in astrophysics

Kramers' opacity law describes the opacity of a medium in terms of the ambient density and temperature, assuming that the opacity is dominated by bound-free absorption (the absorption of light during ionization of a bound electron) or free-free absorption (the absorption of light when scattering a free ion, inverse of bremsstrahlung). It is often used to model radiative transfer, particularly in stellar atmospheres. The relation is named after the Dutch physicist Hendrik Kramers, who first derived the form in 1923.

The general functional form of the opacity law is $\bar{\kappa}\propto\rho$ $T^{-7/2},$ where

$\bar{\kappa}$ is the resulting average opacity ((kg/m^{3})^{−1}/m),
$\rho$ is the density and
$T$ the temperature of the medium.

Often the overall opacity is inferred from observations, and this form of the relation describes how changes in the density or temperature (highly non-linear) will affect the opacity.

== Calculation ==
The specific forms for bound-free and free-free absorption are:

- Bound-free
  $$\bar{\kappa}_\text{bf}=4.34\times10^{25}\frac{g_\text{bf}}{t}\cdot Z(1+X)\cdot\frac{\rho}{\rm g/cm^3}\left(\frac{T}{\rm K}\right)^{-7/2}{\rm\,cm^2\,g^{-1}},$$
- Free-free
  $$\bar{\kappa}_\text{ff} = 3.68 \times 10^{22} g_\text{ff} \cdot(1-Z)(1+X)\cdot \frac{\rho}{\mathrm{g/cm^3
}} \left(\frac{T}{\rm K}\right)^{-7/2} \mathrm{cm^2 \, g^{-1}}.$$

By classical electron-scattering (Thomson) opacity depends on H-ion concentration alone:
$$\bar{\kappa}_\mathrm{es}=0.2(1+X)\mathrm{\,cm^2\,g^{-1}}=0.02(1+X)\mathrm{\,m^2\, kg^{-1}}$$
Compton scattering of electrons occurs at higher photon energy.

Here, $g_\text{bf}$ and $g_\text{ff}$ are the Gaunt factors of circa 1 (quantum-mechanical correction terms) associated with bound-free and free-free transitions respectively. The $t$ is an additional correction factor, typically having a value between 1 and 100. The opacity depends on the number density of electrons and ions in the medium, described by the fractional abundance (by mass):

- of elements heavier than helium, $Z,$
- and of hydrogen, $X.$

With only helium present (and classical behaviour) $\bar{\kappa}_\text{ff}$ is proportional to mass density and $T^{-3.5},$ valid also for $\bar{\kappa}_\text{bf}$ in lithium etc. medium.

== Bibliography ==
- Carroll, Bradley; Ostlie, Dale (1996). Modern Astrophysics. Addison-Wesley.
- Phillips, A. C. (1999). The Physics of Stars. Wiley.
