= Paul Humphrey =

Paul Humphrey may refer to:

- Paul Humphrey (American football) (1917–2006), center
- Paul Humphrey (American musician) (1935–2014), American jazz and R&B drummer
- Paul Humphrey (Canadian musician) (1959–2021), singer for band Blue Peter

== See also ==
- Paul Humphreys (disambiguation)
