= Coulomb barrier =

Electrostatic energy barrier that must be overcome for nuclear reactions to occur

The Coulomb barrier, named after Coulomb's law, which is in turn named after physicist Charles-Augustin de Coulomb, is the energy barrier caused by electrostatic interaction that two nuclei need to overcome so they can get close enough to undergo a nuclear reaction such as nuclear fusion.

== Potential energy barrier ==
This energy barrier is given by the electric potential energy:

$$U_\text{coulomb} = {1\over 4\pi\varepsilon_0} {q_1 q_2\over r}$$

where

ε_{0} is the permittivity of free space
q_{1}, q_{2} are the charges of the interacting particles
r is the interaction radius

A positive value of U is due to a repulsive force, so interacting particles are at higher energy levels as they get closer. A negative potential energy indicates a bound state (due to an attractive force).

The Coulomb barrier increases with the atomic numbers (i.e. the number of protons) of the colliding nuclei:

$$U_\text{coulomb} = {{Z_1 Z_2 e^2}\over 4\pi \varepsilon_0 r}$$

where e is the elementary charge, and Z_{i} the corresponding atomic numbers.

To overcome this barrier, nuclei have to collide at high velocities, so their kinetic energies drive them close enough for the strong interaction to take place and bind them together.

According to the kinetic theory of gases, the temperature of a gas is just a measure of the average kinetic energy of the particles in that gas. For classical ideal gases the velocity distribution of the gas particles is given by Maxwell–Boltzmann. From this distribution, the fraction of particles with a velocity high enough to overcome the Coulomb barrier can be determined.

In practice, temperatures needed to overcome the Coulomb barrier turned out to be smaller than expected due to quantum mechanical tunnelling, as established by Gamow. The consideration of barrier-penetration through tunnelling and the speed distribution gives rise to a limited range of conditions where fusion can take place, known as the Gamow window.

The absence of the Coulomb barrier for uncharged particles enabled the discovery of the neutron by James Chadwick in 1932.

== Potential energy barrier models ==
There is keen interest in the mechanics and parameters of nuclear fusion, including methods of modeling the Coulomb barrier for scientific and educational purposes. The Coulomb barrier is a type of potential energy barrier, and is central to nuclear fusion. It results from the interplay of two fundamental interactions: the strong interaction at close-range within ≈ 1 femtometre (fm), and the electromagnetic interaction at far-range beyond the Coulomb barrier.

The microscopic range of the strong interaction, as well as its odd behavior relative to other fundamental forces, present a challenge to model and no classical examples exist on the human scale. Gravitational and electrostatic forces scale with the inverse of the square of the distance between them. But at short distances, the strong force is attractive and actually increases with distance (up to about 1 fm), beyond which the interaction transitions abruptly to repulsion. A visual and tactile classroom model of this strange behavior garnered first prize at the 2023 national apparatus competition of the American Academy of Physics Teachers in Sacramento, California. The apparatus uses circular arrays of alternating antiparallel double N and single S magnets to generate asymmetric alternating N/S magnetic fields that result in strong magnetic attraction within ≈ 1cm, and weaker repulsion at a distance beyond ≈ 1cm. Instructions for how to build an inexpensive 3D printed model of the magnetic "Coulomb" barrier apparatus are included in a follow-on Physics Education publication.

Magnetic and electric forces were unified within the electromagnetic fundamental force by James Clerk Maxwell in 1873 in A Treatise on Electricity and Magnetism. In the case of the magnetic "Coulomb" barrier apparatus, a potential energy barrier arises between alternating/unequal asymmetric North/South magnetic poles, as described in a related magnetic potential energy barrier patent (US11,087,910 B2). An included method extends the phenomenon to further include the modelling of an electrostatic potential energy barrier, as well, using alternating/unequal positive and negative electrostatic charges. A potential energy barrier and fusion potential curve are shown to arise between a pair of deuterons, each modelled as a linear arrangement of six regularly-spaced up (+2/3) and down (-1/3) quark charges.
