= Kramers' law =

Formula about X-ray emission spectra

Kramers' law is a formula for the spectral distribution of X-rays produced by an electron hitting a solid target. The formula concerns only bremsstrahlung radiation, not the element specific characteristic radiation. It is named after its discoverer, the Dutch physicist Hendrik Anthony Kramers.

The formula for Kramers' law is usually given as the distribution of intensity (photon count) $I$ against the wavelength $\lambda$ of the emitted radiation: $I(\lambda)d\lambda = K \left( \frac{\lambda}{\lambda_\text{min}} - 1 \right) \frac{1}{\lambda^2} d\lambda$

The constant K is proportional to the atomic number of the target element, and $\lambda_\text{min}$ is the minimum wavelength given by the Duane–Hunt law. The maximum intensity is $\frac{K}{4\lambda_\text{min}^2}$ at $2 \lambda_\text{min}$.

The intensity described above is a particle flux and not an energy flux as can be seen by the fact that the integral over values from $\lambda_{min}$ to $\infty$ is infinite. However, the integral of the energy flux is finite.

To obtain a simple expression for the energy flux, first change variables from $\lambda$ (the wavelength) to $\omega$ (the angular frequency) using $\lambda = 2\pi c/\omega$ and also using $\tilde I(\omega) = I(\lambda) \frac{-d\lambda}{d\omega}$. Now $\tilde I(\omega)$ is that quantity which is integrated over $\omega$ from 0 to $\omega_\text{max}$ to get the total number (still infinite) of photons, where $\omega_\text{max} = 2\pi c / \lambda_\text{min}$: $\tilde I(\omega) = \frac{K}{2\pi c} \left( \frac{\omega_\text{max}}{\omega} - 1\right)$

The energy flux, which we will call $\psi(\omega)$ (but which may also be referred to as the "intensity" in conflict with the above name of $I(\lambda)$) is obtained by multiplying the above $\tilde I$ by the energy $\hbar\omega$: $\psi(\omega) = \frac{K}{2\pi c}(\hbar\omega_\text{max}-\hbar\omega)$ for $\omega \le \omega_\text{max}$ $\psi(\omega)=0$ for $\omega\ge \omega_\text{max}$.

It is a linear function that is zero at the maximum energy $\hbar\omega_\text{max}$.
