= Cramér's theorem =

Cramér's theorem may refer to

- Cramér’s decomposition theorem, a statement about the sum of normal distributed random variable
- Cramér's theorem (large deviations), a fundamental result in the theory of large deviations
- Cramer's theorem (algebraic curves), a result regarding the necessary number of points to determine a curve

== See also ==
- Cramer's rule
