= Duane–Hunt law =

Physical law

Spectrum of the X-rays emitted by an X-ray tube with a rhodium target, operated at 60 kV. The continuous curve is due to bremsstrahlung, and the spikes are characteristic K lines for rhodium. The Duane–Hunt law explains why the continuous curve goes to zero at 21 pm.

The Duane–Hunt law, named after the American physicists William Duane and Franklin L. Hunt, gives the maximum frequency of X-rays that can be emitted by Bremsstrahlung in an X-ray tube by accelerating electrons through an excitation voltage V into a metal target.

The maximum frequency ν_{max} is given by

$$\nu_{\rm max} = \frac{eV}{h},$$

which corresponds to a minimum wavelength

$$\lambda_{\rm min} = \frac{hc}{eV},$$

where h is the Planck constant, e is the charge of the electron, and c is the speed of light. This can also be written as:

$$\lambda_{\rm min} \approx \frac{1239.8 \, \mathrm{kV{\cdot}pm}}{V\text{ in kV}}.$$

The process of X-ray emission by incoming electrons is also known as the inverse photoelectric effect.

== Explanation ==
In an X-ray tube, electrons are accelerated in a vacuum by an electric field and shot into a piece of metal called the "target". X-rays are emitted as the electrons slow down (decelerate) in the metal. The output spectrum consists of a continuous spectrum of X-rays, with additional sharp peaks at certain energies (see graph on right). The continuous spectrum is due to bremsstrahlung, while the sharp peaks are characteristic X-rays associated with the atoms in the target.

The spectrum has a sharp cutoff at low wavelength (high frequency), which is due to the limited energy of the incoming electrons. For example, if each electron in the tube is accelerated through 60 kV, then it will acquire a kinetic energy of 60 keV, and when it strikes the target it can create X-ray photons with energy of at most 60 keV, by conservation of energy. (This upper limit corresponds to the electron coming to a stop by emitting just one X-ray photon. Usually the electron emits many photons, and each has an energy less than 60 keV.) A photon with energy of 60 keV or less has a wavelength of 21 pm or more, so the X-ray spectrum has exactly that cutoff, as seen in the graph. This cutoff applies to both the continuous (bremsstrahlung) spectrum and the characteristic sharp peaks: There is no X-ray of any kind beyond the cutoff. However, the cutoff is most obvious for the continuous spectrum.

The exact formula for the cutoff comes from setting equal the kinetic energy of the electron, E = eV, and the energy of the X-ray photon, E = hν = hc/λ.
