= Gaunt factor =

The Gaunt factor (or Kramers–Gaunt factor) is a correction factor that accounts for the effect of quantum mechanics on an object's continuous x-ray absorption or emission spectrum. In cases where classical physics provides a close approximation to the true spectrum, the Gaunt factor is close to 1. When quantum physics becomes important, it becomes bigger or smaller than 1.

The Gaunt factor was named after the physicist John Arthur Gaunt, based on his work on the quantum mechanics of continuous absorption. Gaunt used a 'g' function in his 1930 work, which Subrahmanyan Chandrasekhar named the 'Gaunt factor' in 1939. It is sometimes named the Kramers-Gaunt factor as Gaunt incorporated the work of Hendrik Anthony Kramers.

== See also ==
- Gamow_factor#History
- Kramers' opacity law
