= Alfred Landé =

German-American physicist

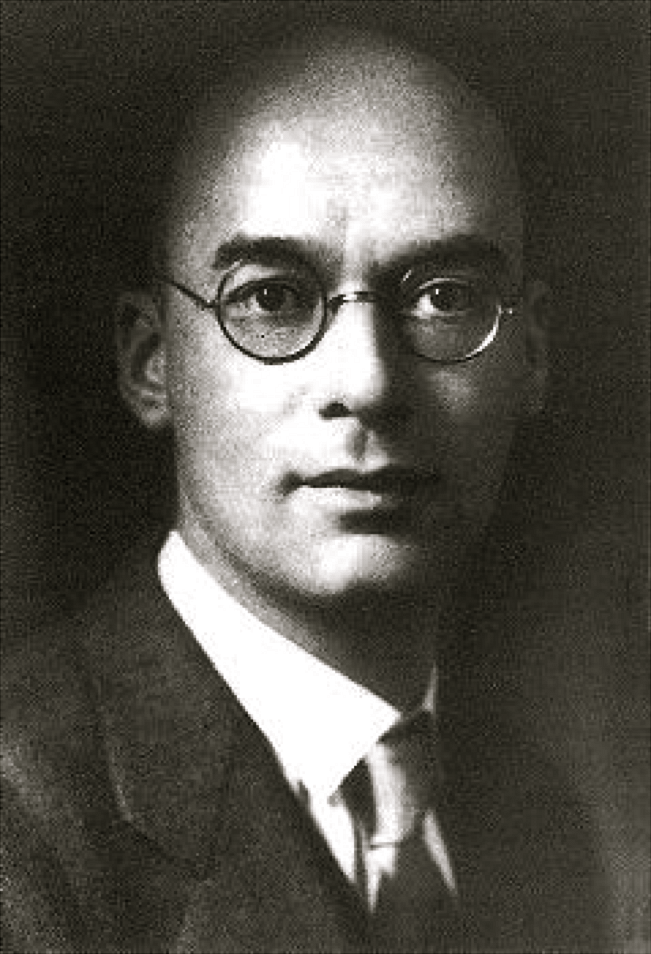
- Alfred Landé in 1940
- Born: 13 December 1888; Elberfeld, German Empire
- Died: 30 October 1976 (aged 87); Columbus, Ohio
- Education: Ludwig-Maximilians-Universität München
- Known for: Landé g-factor Landé interval rule Born–Landé equation
- Scientific career
- Fields: Quantum mechanics

Alfred Landé (13 December 1888 – 30 October 1976) was a German-American physicist known for his contributions to quantum theory. He is responsible for the Landé g-factor and an explanation of the Zeeman effect.

== Life and achievements ==
Alfred Landé was born on 13 December 1888 in Elberfeld, Rhineland, Germany, today part of the city of Wuppertal, Germany.

In 1913, Landé was sent by Arnold Sommerfeld, his thesis advisor at the Ludwig-Maximilians-Universität München, to be a special assistant for physics to David Hilbert at the University of Göttingen, to replace Paul Peter Ewald, whom Sommerfeld had sent to the same position in 1912. There, Landé also came in close contact with Max Born. In physics, it was the era of the Bohr atom model. The leaders of Göttingen science included many greats that Landé was to come in contact with including Hilbert, Edmund Landau, Carl Runge and Ludwig Prandtl (the noted aerodynamics theoreticist). Also Niels Bohr and Hendrik Lorentz visited Göttingen frequently.

Landé obtained his doctorate under Sommerfeld at the Ludwig-Maximilians-Universität München, two weeks prior to the start of the First World War. He joined the Red Cross and served for two years on the eastern front before being invited by Max Born to join him at the Artillery Testing Commission, one of the few scientific sections of the army. Apart from their work on artillery location by sound ranging, they began to examine the cohesive forces and compressibility of crystals. This work led to the unexpected result that the electron trajectories in atoms were not at all like planetary orbits, which at the time was the usual understanding of the electron in an atom.

Landé studied atomic structure intensively for the next seven years. In 1916 Sommerfeld had begun to apply the new atomic theory to form a general quantization rule. Landé's work over cubic and tetrahedral electron trajectories ("cube atoms") became of great interest to Sommerfeld, Peter Debye and Bohr.

In 1919 Landé unexpectedly turned to spectroscopy even though the continuation of the study of the spatial orientation of the atoms was the most pressing problem of the time. He turned to the problem of atoms with several electrons, in particular to the simplest case, the spectrum of helium. The spectroscopy of helium had been examined experimentally by Friedrich Paschen, but there did not exist a theoretical interpretation. The spectrum showed non-combining single and double (actually triplet, as it turned out later) terms so that it seemed as if helium was made of two different substances (which is explained today as the result of electron spin).

Landé's work contained several new important ideas, including the rule of vector addition of two quantum-mechanical angular momenta J1 and J2. His findings and postulates were later confirmed by quantum theory.

Landé's Frankfurt investigations (December 1920 until April 1921) ended with the discovery of the well-known Landé g-formula and an explanation for the anomalous Zeeman effect. The Landé g-factor is now defined through m_{J}, the magnetic quantum number.

In 1923, Landé stated the Landé interval rule, a rule dealing with the relation between an electron's spin and orbital angular momentum.

During 1925 Ralph Kronig, who presented the idea of electron spin some months before George Uhlenbeck and Samuel Goudsmit, was working as an assistant to Landé.

In late 1929 Landé was invited to Ohio State University in Columbus, to present a series of lectures. After a second stay (1930-1931) in Columbus, Ohio, he decided to establish himself in the United States. Landé was a forerunner in a phase of new interpretation of quantum theory, from which concrete physical statements about experimentally verifiable facts can be made. This happened, after the first phase of the interpretation of the theory with well-known discussions between Niels Bohr, Werner Heisenberg and Wolfgang Pauli who favoured the Copenhagen Interpretation, opposed in varying degrees by Erwin Schrödinger, Louis de Broglie and, most notably, Albert Einstein. Quantum mechanics was providing many new predictions to be investigated and proved or disproved at the time. The renewed interest expressed itself in new experiments with new technical methods, on individual quantum systems, individual atoms, electrons and photons.

However, after 1950 (and for the rest of his life), Landé turned energetically against the Copenhagen interpretation of quantum theory, requiring, as did Einstein, an objectively real description of physical processes. This change was driven by Landé's perception that wave-particle duality was an unnecessary misrepresentation of quantum processes that he instead explained by developing a new unitary particle formulation, without dualistic reference to waves. Landé based his new formulation upon non-quantal principles of symmetry and invariance, with Duane's rule for quantisation of momentum exchange with space-periodic structures, and Leibniz's Principle of Cause-Effect Continuity to explain the intrinsically probabilistic nature of quantum processes. The Landé interpretation is considered a minority interpretation of quantum mechanics.

Landé died on 30 October 1976 in Columbus, Ohio.

== Books ==
- Alfred Landé Principles of Quantum Mechanics (Macmillan/Cambridge, 1937)
- Alfred Landé Quantum Mechanics (Cambridge University Press, 1951)
- Alfred Landé Quantum Mechanics (Sir Isaac Pitman & Sons, 1951)
- Alfred Landé Foundations of Quantum Theory: A Study in Continuity and Symmetry (Yale, 1955)
- Alfred Landé From Dualism to Unity in Quantum Physics (Cambridge University Press, Cambridge, 1960)
- Alfred Landé New Foundations of Quantum Mechanics (Cambridge University Press, 1965)
- Alfred Landé Quantum Mechanics in a New Key (Exposition Press, 1973)
