= Duane's hypothesis =

In early 1923, American physicist William Duane introduced a momentum-exchange approach to describe how X-rays interact with a crystal lattice as a quantum process, aiming to provide a unified description that could encompass scattering dynamics involving quantum processes such as X-ray fluorescence, as well as elastic scattering, as in wave diffraction models.

Duane's central hypothesis, that the momentum of radiation is transferred to and from matter in discrete quanta, built on the principles of photon momentum and energy that were also a feature of Arthur Compton's work on the Compton effect, which was still awaiting formal publication but was presented in lectures and at an APS conference talk December 1922.

Duane showed that when X-ray photons are elastically reflected within a periodic lattice, the change in each photon's momentum satisfies a quantum selection rule in which the momentum exchanged between the photon and each of the lattice's primary sets of planes (i.e. the planes bounding the Wigner–Seitz cell) occurs in integer multiples n of h/d, where h is the Planck constant and d is the spacing between lattice planes.

In the case where the photon's momentum changes only with respect to a single set of planes, the quantum rule coincides with the Bragg diffraction condition for that set of planes.

Although Duane's 1923 model incorporated the Bohr-Sommerfeld momentum quantisation rule from early quantum theory and was limited by it, it remains historically significant as the first quantum account of X-ray diffraction.

After introducing elastic scattering, Duane's paper explored a possible method for determining the directions of scattering peaks produced by fluorescence within the lattice, but found no satisfactory way to solve the problem.

Duane applied his hypothesis to derive the scattering angles of X-rays elastically scattered by a crystal, and subsequently, the principles that Duane advanced were also seen to provide the correct relationships for optical scattering at gratings, and the diffraction of electrons as in the Davisson-Germer experiment.

Alfred Landé, the German-American physicist known for his 'Landé g-factor' and explanation of the anomalous Zeeman effect in atomic physics, used Duane's hypothesis as the basis for his alternative 'New Foundations of Quantum Mechanics' in his 1965 book.

== Early developments in quantum theory ==
In 1905, Albert Einstein presented the hypothesis that the photoelectric effect could be explained if a beam of light was composed of a stream of discrete particles (photons), each with an energy (E = hf) the energy (E) of each photon being equal to the frequency (f) multiplied by the Planck constant (h). Later, in 1916 Albert Einstein also showed that the recoil of molecules during the emission and absorption of photons was consistent with, and necessary for, a quantum description of thermal radiation processes. Each photon acts as if it imparts a momentum impulse p equal to its energy divided by the speed of light, (p = E/c).

In 1925, shortly before the development of the full mathematical description of quantum mechanics, Born drew Einstein's attention to the then-new idea of "de Broglie's waves". He wrote "It seems to me that a connection of a completely formal kind exists between these and that other mystical explanation of reflection, diffraction and interference using 'spatial' quantisation which Compton and Duane proposed and which has been more closely studied by Epstein and Ehrenfest." Examining the hypothesis of Duane on quantized translational momentum transfer, as it accounted for X-ray diffraction by crystals, and its follow-up by Compton, Epstein and Ehrenfest had written "The phenomena of Fraunhofer diffraction can be treated as well on the basis of the wave theory of light as by a combination of concept of light quanta with Bohr's principle of correspondence." Later, Born and Biem wrote: "Every physicist must accept Duane's rule."

Using Duane's 1923 hypothesis, the old quantum theory and the de Broglie relation, linking wavelengths and frequencies to energy and momenta, gives an account of diffraction of material particles.

=== Young's two-slit diffraction experiment, with Fourier analysis ===
Gregory Breit in 1923 pointed out that such quantum translational momentum transfer, examined by Fourier analysis in the old quantum theory, accounts for diffraction even by only two slits. More recently, two slit particle diffraction has been experimentally demonstrated with single-particle buildup of electron diffraction patterns, as may be seen in the photo in this reference and with helium atoms and molecules.

=== Bragg diffraction ===
A wave of wavelength λ is incident at angle θ upon an array of crystal atomic planes, lying in a characteristic orientation, separated by a characteristic distance d. Two rays of the beam are reflected from planes separated by distance nd, where n denotes the number of planes of the separation, and is called the order of diffraction. If θ is such that

$$2 d\sin\theta = n\lambda \,,$$

then there is constructive interference between the reflected rays, which may be observed in the interference pattern. This is Bragg's law.

The same phenomenon, considered from a different viewpoint, is described by a beam of particles of momentum p incident at angle θ upon the same array of crystal atomic planes. It is supposed that a collective of n such atomic planes reflects the particle, transferring to it a momentum nP, where P is a momentum characteristic of the reflecting planes, in the direction perpendicular to them. The reflection is elastic, with negligible transfer of kinetic energy, because the crystal is massive. The initial momentum of the particle in the direction perpendicular to the reflecting planes was p sin θ. For reflection, the change of momentum of the particle in that direction must be 2p sin θ. Consequently,

$$2 p\sin\theta = nP \,.$$

This agrees with the observed Bragg condition for the diffraction pattern if θ is such that

$p/d = P/ \lambda$ or $p\lambda = Pd \,.$

It is evident that p provides information for a particle viewpoint, while λ provides information for a wave viewpoint. Before the discovery of quantum mechanics, de Broglie in 1923 discovered how to inter-translate the particle viewpoint information and the wave viewpoint information for material particles: use the Planck constant and recall Einstein's formula for photons:

$$p\lambda = h \,.$$

It follows that the characteristic quantum of translational momentum P for the crystal planes of interest is given by

$P = h/d\,.$

== Quantum mechanics ==
According to Ballentine, Duane's proposal of quantum translational momentum transfer is no longer needed as a special hypothesis; rather, it is predicted as a theorem of quantum mechanics. It is presented in terms of quantum mechanics by other present day writers also.

== Diffraction ==
One may consider a particle with translational momentum $\vec p$, a vectorial quantity.

In the simplest example of scattering of two colliding particles with initial momenta $\vec{p}_{i1},\vec{p}_{i2}$, resulting in final momenta $\vec{p}_{f1},\vec{p}_{f2}$. The momentum transfer is given by

$$\vec q = \vec{p}_{i1} - \vec{p}_{f1} = \vec{p}_{f2} - \vec{p}_{i2}$$

where the last identity expresses momentum conservation.

In diffraction, the difference of the momenta of the scattered particle and the incident particle is called momentum transfer.

Such phenomena can also be considered from a wave viewpoint, by use of the reduced Planck constant $\hbar$. The wave number $k$ is the absolute value of the wave vector $\vec k = \vec p/\hbar$, which is related to the wavelength $\lambda=2\pi/k$. Often, momentum transfer is given in wavenumber units in reciprocal length $Q = k_f - k_i$

Momentum transfer is an important quantity because $\Delta x = \hbar / |q|$ is a better measure for the typical distance resolution of the reaction than the momenta themselves.

Bragg diffraction occurs on the atomic crystal lattice. It conserves the particle energy and thus is called elastic scattering. The wave numbers of the final and incident particles, $k_f$ and $k_i$, respectively, are equal. Just the direction changes by a reciprocal lattice vector $\vec G = \vec Q = \vec k_f -\vec k_i$ with the relation to the lattice spacing $G = 2\pi / d$. As momentum is conserved, the transfer of momentum occurs to crystal momentum.

For the investigation of condensed matter, neutron, X-ray and electron diffraction are nowadays commonly studied as momentum transfer processes.

== Physical accounts of wave and of particle diffraction ==
The phenomena may be analysed in several appropriate ways. The incoming and outgoing diffracted objects may be treated severally as particles or as waves. The diffracting object may be treated as a macroscopic classical object free of quantum features, or it may be treated as a physical object with essentially quantum character. Several cases of these forms of analysis, of which there are eight, have been considered. For example, Schrödinger proposed a purely wave account of the Compton effect.

=== Classical diffractor ===
A classical diffractor is devoid of quantum character. For diffraction, classical physics usually considers the case of an incoming and an outgoing wave, not of particle beams. When diffraction of particle beams was discovered by experiment, it seemed fitting to many writers to continue to think in terms of classical diffractors, formally belonging to the macroscopic laboratory apparatus, and of wave character belonging to the quantum object that suffers diffraction.

It seems that Heisenberg in 1927 was thinking in terms of a classical diffractor. According to Bacciagaluppi & Crull (2009), Heisenberg in 1927 recognized that "the electron is deflected only in the discrete directions that depend on the global properties of the grating". Nevertheless, it seems that this did not lead him to think that the collective global properties of the grating should make it a diffractor with corresponding quantal properties, such as would supply the diffracted electron with a definite trajectory. It seems, rather, that he thought of the diffraction as necessarily a manifestation of wave character belonging to the electron. It seems that he felt this was necessary to explain interference when the electron was detected far from the diffractor. Thus it seems possible that in 1927, Heisenberg was not thinking in terms of Duane's hypothesis of quantal transfer of translative momentum. By 1930, however, Heisenberg thought enough of Duane's hypothesis to expound it in his textbook.

=== Quantum diffractor ===
A quantum diffractor has an essentially quantum character. It was first conceived of in 1923 by William Duane, in the days of the old quantum theory, to account for diffraction of X-rays as particles according to Einstein's new conception of them, as carriers of quanta of momentum. The diffractor was imagined as exhibiting quantum transfer of translational momentum, in close analogy with transfer of angular momentum in integer multiples of the Planck constant. The quantum of translational momentum was proposed to be explained by global quantum physical properties of the diffractor arising from its spatial periodicity. This is consonant with present-day quantum mechanical thinking, in which macroscopic physical bodies are conceived as supporting collective modes, manifest for example in quantized quasi-particles, such as phonons. Formally, the diffractor belongs to the quantum system, not to the classical laboratory apparatus.
