= Central field approximation =

Approximation for many-electron atoms in quantum physics

In atomic physics, the central field approximation for many-electron atoms takes the combined electric fields of the nucleus and all the electrons acting on any of the electrons to be radial and to be the same for all the electrons in the atom. That is, every electron sees an identical potential $U(r)$ that is only a function of its distance from the nucleus.

This facilitates an approximate analytical solution to the eigenvalue problem for the Hamiltonian operator.
