= Paul Humphreys (philosopher) =

British professor of philosophy (1950–2022)

Paul Humphreys (1950-2022) was a British professor of philosophy at the University of Virginia, specialising in philosophy of science, metaphysics, and epistemology. His interests included the metaphysics and epistemology of emergence, computational science, empiricism and realism.

== Education and career ==
Humphreys earned his undergraduate degree at the University of Sussex, and then went to Stanford University where he received his Ph.D. in 1976. He joined the University of Virginia faculty in 1978, where he spent the rest of his career (apart from visiting appointments at University of Arizona, Stanford University, University of Pittsburgh and others), rising to the rank of "Commonwealth Professor of Philosophy."

== Philosophical work ==
He was a significant contributor to the philosophy of emergent properties, as well as other areas in the philosophy of science and philosophy of probability.

Humphreys published a substantial number of books and scholarly articles. He was Series Editor for the Oxford Studies in the Philosophy of Science. He serves on the editorial Boards of the American Philosophical Quarterly, Philosophy of Science, and Foundations of Science.

== Select publications ==
- Emergence: Contemporary Readings in Science and Philosophy. Mark Bedau and Paul Humphreys (eds). The MIT Press, 2007 ISBN 978-0262026215
- Extending Ourselves: Computational Science, Empiricism, and Scientific Method (Oxford, 2004) ISBN 0-19-515870-9
- "Some Considerations on Conditional Chance," British Journal for the Philosophy of Science (2004)
- "Computational Models", Philosophy of Science 69 (2002), S1-S11
- "Are There Algorithms that Discover Causal Structure?" Synthese (1999, with David Freedman)
- "How Properties Emerge," Philosophy of Science 64 (1997), 1-17
- The Chances of Explanation (Princeton, 1989) Humphreys, Paul (14 July 2014). 2014 pbk edition. Princeton University Press. ISBN 978-0-691-02086-0.
- "Why Propensities Cannot Be Probabilities," The Philosophical Review 94 (1985), 557-570
