= CSL =

CSL as an abbreviation may stand for:

== Places ==
- Coordinated Science Laboratory, at the University of Illinois
- Liège Space Center (Centre spatial de Liège), at the University of Liege in Belgium
- Central Science Laboratory, a former UK DEFRA laboratory services agency
- Cabo San Lucas, a resort city located at the southern tip of the Baja California Peninsula, in Baja California Sur

== Languages ==
- Croatian Sign Language, a sign language for the deaf in Croatia
- Chinese Sign Language, a sign language for the deaf in China, Malaysia, and Taiwan
- Clay Sanskrit Library, a series of books in Sanskrit with English translations
- Context-sensitive language, a class of formal languages in computational linguistics

== Sciences ==
- Crosshole sonic logging, method for testing a constructed material
- Calcium stearoyl-2-lactylate, a food additive used as an emulsifier
- Continuous spontaneous localization, a dynamical reduction theory in quantum mechanics
- Hartmann's solution, compound sodium lactate, used in intravenous transfusions

== Military ==
- Cooperative Security Location, a US military facility
- CSL, the designation code for Royal Australian Navy Wattle-class crane stores lighters

== Computing ==
- Citation Style Language, an open XML-based standard to format citations and bibliographies
- Current-steering logic, an alternative name for emitter-coupled logic in electronics
- Context-sensitive language, a language generated from a context-sensitive grammar

== Companies ==
- CSL Group Ltd, a British machine to machine communications company
- CSL Mobile, subsidiary of Hong Kong Telecom
- CSL Limited, an Australian biotechnology company, formerly Commonwealth Serum Laboratories
  - CSL Behring, a subsidiary company of CSL Limited
- Canada Steamship Lines, a Canadian shipping company
- CSL Sofas, a furniture chain in the United Kingdom
- Cochin Shipyard Limited, a shipbuilding company in Kerala, India

== Sports ==
- CAL Spora Luxembourg, amateur athletics club in Luxembourg
- Canadian Soccer League, a soccer league in Canada since 2006
- Canadian Soccer League (1987–1992), a soccer league in Canada
- Chinese Super League, the premier league of association football in China
- Cosmopolitan Soccer League, a soccer league in United States
- IOC sport code for canoe slalom at the Summer Olympics

== Politics ==
- Canadian Socialist League, a political party active from 1898 to 1904
- Czechoslovak People's Party (Československá strana lidová, ČSL), a political party

== Others ==
- CSL-TV, an American Forces Network television station in Lajes Field, Azores, Portugal
- Centers for Spiritual Living, a religious denomination
- Certain models of BMW car, designated BMW CSL
- Charter seat license, name used by a few sports teams for a personal seat license
