= 2017 YE5 =

Binary near-Earth asteroid

2017 YE_{5}
- Radar images of binary asteroid 2017 YE_{5} taken by the Arecibo Observatory in June 2018

Discovery
- Discovered by: Claudine Rinner
- Discovery site: Oukaïmeden Obs.
- Discovery date: 21 December 2017

Designations
- Alternative designations: tltv005
- Minor planet category: Apollo · PHA · NEO

Orbital characteristics
- Epoch 31 May 2020 (JD 2459000.5)
- Uncertainty parameter 2
- Observation arc: 0.74 yr (270 days)
- Earliest precovery date: 12 December 2017
- Aphelion: 4.818 AU
- Perihelion: 0.818 AU
- Semi-major axis: 2.818 AU
- Eccentricity: 0.70964
- Orbital period (sidereal): 4.73 yr (1,728 days)
- Mean anomaly: 155.681°
- Mean motion: 0° 12^{m} 29.952^{s} / day
- Inclination: 6.218°
- Longitude of ascending node: 103.927°
- Argument of perihelion: 110.794°
- Known satellites: 1
- Earth MOID: 0.0209 AU
- T_{Jupiter}: 2.877

Physical characteristics
- Mean diameter: 0.90±0.05 km or 900±50 m (for each body)
- Mean density: 0.6–1.2 g/cm^{3}
- Synodic rotation period: 14.88±0.02 h
- Geometric albedo: 0.02–0.04
- Spectral type: D
- Apparent magnitude: 26.8
- Absolute magnitude (H): 19.2 (combined); 19.3

2017 YE_{5} is a binary pair of asteroids of approximately equal size and mass, each about 0.9 km (0.56 mi) in diameter. Classified as a near-Earth asteroid and potentially hazardous object of the Apollo group, 2017 YE_{5} was discovered by amateur astronomer Claudine Rinner at the Oukaïmeden Observatory on 21 December 2017. On 21 June 2018, the pair of asteroids passed within 15.5 lunar distances or approximately 6 million km (3.7 million mi) from Earth. During the close encounter, 2017 YE_{5} was resolved in high detail by concurrent radar observations by the Arecibo and Green Bank observatories, along with individual observations by the Goldstone Solar System Radar. 2017 YE_{5} is likely an extinct or dormant comet due to its distant elliptical orbit and dark red surface.

== Discovery ==
2017 YE_{5} was discovered on 21 December 2017, by French amateur astronomer Claudine Rinner at the Oukaïmeden Observatory in Marrakesh, Morocco. The discovery formed part of the Morocco Oukaïmeden Sky Survey (MOSS) directed by Zouhair Benkhaldoun at the Cadi Ayyad University. The MOSS survey was designed for searching and characterizing the orbits of small Solar System bodies such as near-Earth asteroids and comets. As the sixth near-Earth asteroid discovered by the MOSS survey, 2017 YE_{5} was found in images taken by the Oukaïmeden Observatory's 0.5-meter reflecting telescope, which was remotely operated by Rinner. At the time of discovery, 2017 YE_{5} was about 1.1 AU (160 million km; 100 million mi) away from Earth, located in the constellation of Gemini at an apparent magnitude of 19.8. (Note: The celestial coordinates of 2017 YE_{5} at the time of discovery were 07^{h} 06^{m} 15.35^{s} −21° 17′ 11.9″. See Gemini for constellation coordinates.)

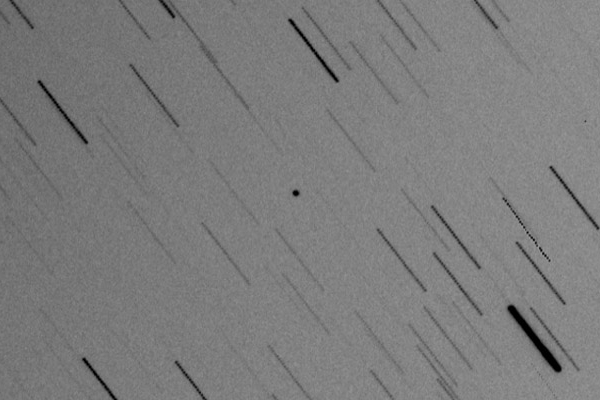
2017 YE_{5} imaged by the Oukaïmeden Observatory on 30 December 2018

The discovery of 2017 YE_{5} was subsequently reported to the Minor Planet Center's Near-Earth Object Confirmation Page (NEOCP), where a preliminary orbit was calculated from additional observations conducted at multiple observatories. Follow-up observations of 2017 YE_{5} spanned six days starting from its discovery, and the object was formally announced in a Minor Planet Electronic Circular issued by the Minor Planet Center on 27 December 2017.

Precovery observations of 2017 YE_{5} were first identified and reported to the Minor Planet Center in February 2018. These observations were from the Mount Lemmon Survey, which had observed 2017 YE_{5} on 14 December 2017, seven days prior to its discovery by the Oukaïmeden Observatory. Earlier precovery observations by the Pan-STARRS1 survey on 12 December 2017 were later identified in May 2018, and are now known to be the earliest reported observations of 2017 YE_{5}.

== Nomenclature ==
Upon discovery, the asteroid was given the temporary internal designation tltv005. After follow up observations confirming the object, it was then given the provisional designation 2017 YE_{5} by the Minor Planet Center on 27 December 2017. The provisional designation signifies the object's discovery date and year, with the second letter and numbers indicating that it is the 130th object discovered during the second half of December 2017. (Note: In the convention for minor planet provisional designations, the first letter represents the half-month of the year of discovery while the second letter and numbers indicate the order of discovery within that half-month. In the case for 2017 YE_{5}, the first letter 'Y' corresponds to the second half-month of December 2017 while the succeeding letter 'E' indicates that it is the 5th object discovered on the 6th cycle of discoveries (with 5 cycles completed). Each completed cycle consists of 25 letters representing discoveries, hence 5 + (5 completed cycles × 25 letters) = 130.) 2017 YE_{5} has not yet been issued a permanent minor planet number by the Minor Planet Center due to its short observation arc of 270 days, which is insufficient for an orbit to be accurately determined. 2017 YE_{5} is expected to receive a minor planet number once it has been observed for over at least four oppositions, which would take several years. Once it receives a minor planet number, it will be eligible for naming.

== Orbit and classification ==
2017 YE_{5} orbits the Sun at an average distance of approximately 2.82 astronomical units (0.422×10^{9} km; 0.262×10^{9} mi), taking 4.73 years to complete one orbit. The orbit of 2017 YE_{5} is slightly inclined to the ecliptic plane by 6.2 degrees, with its farthest apsis oriented below the ecliptic. 2017 YE_{5} has a highly elongated orbit with an orbital eccentricity of 0.71. Over the course of its orbit, 2017 YE_{5} approaches 0.82 AU from the Sun at perihelion and recedes 4.82 AU from the Sun at aphelion, beyond the outer extent of the asteroid belt.

Animation of 2017 YE_{5}'s orbit during the 2018 close encounter with Earth, with the asteroid belt and orbits of the planets for scale

At aphelion, 2017 YE_{5} approaches close to Jupiter's orbit, with a minimum orbital intersection distance (MOID) of 0.42 AU. At such close proximity to Jupiter's orbit, 2017 YE_{5} has likely been gravitationally perturbed by Jupiter, indicated by its Tisserand parameter of 2.877, which is considered to be characteristic of comets. Because of its comet-like Tisserand parameter and relatively large orbit for a near-Earth object, 2017 YE_{5} has been suspected to be an extinct or dormant Jupiter-family comet. Additional evidence for its cometary origin was found by optical and infrared spectroscopy in 2018, which revealed a reddish and low-albedo surface, consistent with the D-type spectral classification.

As a near-Earth object, the orbit of 2017 YE_{5} crosses that of Earth's, which leads to occasional close approaches to the planet. It has a semi-major axis (orbital distance) greater than 1 AU and a perihelion distance within that of Earth's, therefore it is formally classified under the Apollo group of near-Earth asteroids. 2017 YE_{5}'s Earth MOID is approximately 0.021 AU (3.1 million km; 2.0 million mi), or about 8 lunar distances. Given a small Earth MOID, 2017 YE_{5} is considered a potentially hazardous asteroid (PHA) by the Minor Planet Center, under the definition that PHAs have Earth MOIDs less than 0.05 AU and absolute magnitudes brighter than 22.

Despite being considered potentially hazardous, there is no risk of impact by 2017 YE_{5}, as it will not make any close Earth encounters within 12 lunar distances or 0.03 AU (4.5 million km; 2.8 million mi) over the next 200 years. 2017 YE_{5} was removed from the JPL Sentry Risk Table on 6 January 2018, after extensive observations and refinements of its orbit ruled out future possibilities of Earth impacts.

=== 2018 Earth approach ===
On 21 June 2018 at 20:53 UTC, 2017 YE_{5} made its closest approach to Earth from a distance of 0.03986 AU (5.96 million km; 3.71 million mi), or 15.52 lunar distances. During the encounter, 2017 YE_{5} approached Earth at a rate of 15.5 km/s (35,000 mph) and its apparent visual brightness peaked around magnitude 15, too faint to be seen with the naked eye. At closest approach, 2017 YE_{5}'s apparent motion in the sky was 0.51 degrees per hour and was in the constellation of Andromeda, with an apparent magnitude of 16.6 and an angular separation of 66 degrees from the Sun. (Note: The celestial coordinates of 2017 YE_{5} at 20:53 UTC are 00^{h} 39^{m} 07.692^{s} +45° 13′ 22.92″. The solar elongation at the time was 66.3 degrees. See Andromeda for constellation coordinates.) After the close encounter with Earth, 2017 YE_{5} continued its approach to aphelion, passing by Mars from a distance of 0.0441 AU (6.6 million km; 4.1 million mi) on 30 July 2018.

==== Observations ====
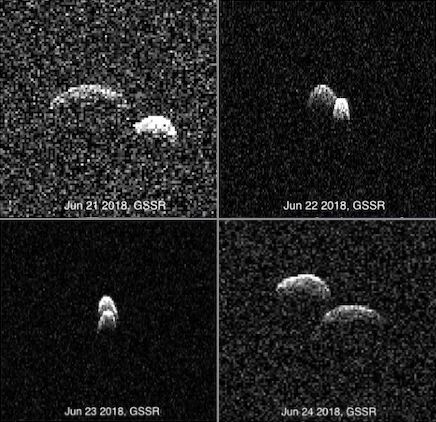
Collage of Goldstone delay-Doppler images of 2017 YE_{5} during its close approach to Earth

The June 2018 encounter with 2017 YE_{5} provided an opportunity for radar observatories to study the asteroid's characteristics in detail. On 17 June 2018, the first radar observations of 2017 YE_{5} were attempted by the monostatic Goldstone Solar System Radar (GSSR) in California, but failed to detect the asteroid due to uncertainties in the radar pointing position. 2017 YE_{5} was later successfully imaged and observed with the GSSR on 21 June 2018, revealing the asteroid's binary nature. Led by radar astronomer Marina Brozović, GSSR observations of 2017 YE_{5} spanned four days, lasting until 24 June 2018. During these observations, the GSSR's preliminary findings were alerted to astronomers at the Arecibo Observatory in Puerto Rico for further study.

Arecibo radar observations of 2017 YE_{5} began on 23 June 2018. The 2017 YE_{5} binary system was observed using a bistatic radar system where the Arecibo Observatory transmitted a radar signal to the pair of asteroids while the Green Bank Observatory in West Virginia received the signal reflected from the asteroids. Led by Arecibo radar astronomers Anne Virkki, Flaviane Venditti, Sean Marshal, along with Patrick Taylor at the Green Bank Observatory, bistatic radar observations resolved 2017 YE_{5} at a resolution of 7.5 meters per pixel. Radar observations of 2017 YE_{5} ended on 26 June 2018 after it had moved out of Arecibo's view. Concurrently, optical observations were also carried out by various observatories in order to compile a light curve of the binary system. Optical observations of 2017 YE_{5} continued after the June 2018 encounter and detected possible mutual events or eclipses occurring between the components of the binary system.

=== Future approaches ===
Over the course of its orbit in the next 200 years, 2017 YE_{5} will continue to pass by Earth, though it will not make any approaches as close as the June 2018 encounter. The next Earth encounter by 2017 YE_{5} will be on 15 April 2037, when it will pass by Earth from a nominal distance of approximately 0.238 AU (35.6 million km; 22.1 million mi). In the next 100 years, 2017 YE_{5} will make three Earth encounters within 0.2 AU (approximately 80 lunar distances), which will occur in February 2051, July 2088, and May 2107. The expected nominal approach distances for these dates are 0.123 AU, 0.179 AU, and 0.145 AU, respectively.

== Binary system ==
Satellite
- Animation of bistatic radar images of 2017 YE_{5} from Arecibo and Green Bank Observatory

Discovery
- Discovered by: Marina Brozović (first observer)
- Discovery site: Goldstone Obs.
- Discovery date: 21 June 2018 (first observed)

Orbital characteristics
- Semi-major axis: 1.8 km (separation from primary)
- Orbital period (sidereal): 23.7±0.1 h
- Satellite of: 2017 YE_{5}

Physical characteristics
- Mean diameter: 0.90±0.05 km or 900±50 m
- Albedo: 0.02–0.04

The secondary component of 2017 YE_{5} was discovered in Goldstone radar observations conducted by Marina Brozović on 21 June 2018. From the first Goldstone radar images, the two components appeared to be contact binary lobes as the components were viewed in front of each other. Additional radar observations by the Arecibo and Green Bank observatories resolved the 2017 YE_{5} system in high resolution, confirming that the two components were indeed separate objects.

=== Physical characteristics ===
Artist's rendering of the 2017 YE_{5} binary system, with the contrasting surface brightnesses and shapes of each component

2017 YE_{5} is an equal-mass binary asteroid consisting of two components approximately 0.9 km (0.56 mi) in diameter. Equal-mass binary systems are relatively rare among the population of binary near-Earth asteroids as they constitute less than 1% of radar-observed near-Earth asteroids larger than 200 m (660 ft) in diameter. 2017 YE_{5} is one of only four systems of that kind known; the other three are 1994 CJ1, 69230 Hermes, and (190166) 2005 UP156.

From their mutual orbit and measured diameters, both components are calculated to have low bulk densities less than 1 g/cm^{3}, indicating a significant macroporosity of their internal structures. Given their measured diameters and absolute magnitudes, the optical albedos of their surfaces are calculated to be as dark as charcoal, reflecting less than 3% of incident light. Unlike other binary asteroid systems observed by radar, the components of 2017 YE_{5} appear to display a distinct difference in their shape, surface brightness and radar reflectivity. These differences imply that the two components may also have different densities, compositions, and surface roughnesses.

=== Orbit and rotation ===
Animation of Goldstone radar images of 2017 YE_{5} on 23 June 2018. The separation between the two components becomes more apparent as they move away from each other.

The pair of asteroids orbit each other around a common center of mass (barycenter) between them. Their mutual orbital period is 22 hours (0.92 days), with an orbital separation of 1.8 km (1.1 mi) or 4 times the component radii. It is uncertain whether both components rotate synchronously with their mutual orbital period, as there is evidence of non-principal-axis rotation (or rotational precession) and axial misalignment of both components. Light curve measurements of 2017 YE_{5} taken between June and August 2018 show a secondary period of 14.88 hours and radar images suggest that the obliquities of the components are misaligned by a few degrees.
