= Giancarlo Ghirardi =

Italian physicist (1935–2018)

- Born: 28 October 1935; Milan, Italy
- Died: 1 June 2018 (aged 82); Grado, Italy
- Education: University of Milan
- Known for: Ghirardi–Rimini–Weber theory Dynamical reduction Quantum Zeno effect
- Scientific career
- Fields: Quantum mechanics
- Workplaces: International School for Advanced Studies, University of Trieste

Giancarlo Ghirardi (28 October 1935 – 1 June 2018) was an Italian physicist and emeritus professor of theoretical physics at the University of Trieste.

He is well known for the Ghirardi–Rimini–Weber theory (GRW), which he proposed in 1985 together with Alberto Rimini and Tullio Weber, and for his contributions to the foundations of quantum mechanics. He independently rederived, in a referee report to Foundations of Physics, the no-cloning theorem, before the works by William Wootters and Wojciech H. Zurek and by Dennis Dieks in 1982, but after the actual first derivation by James L. Park in 1970.

His research interests related to a variety of topics of theoretical physics, but focused beginning in 1983 mainly on the foundations of quantum mechanics.

Ghirardi was a member of the editorial boards of Foundations of Physics and Studies in History and Philosophy of Science. He was president of the Italian Society for the Foundations of Physics, of which he was one of the founding members.

The President of the Province of Trieste, Maria Teresa Bassa Poropat, conferred the Sigillo della Provincia di Trieste to Giancarlo Ghirardi for research and teaching, for his commitment to the promotion and development of physics in Trieste and for his intense and fruitful activity as the author of popular books and scientific publications.

In 2017, he was awarded the Spirit of Salam prize for his extraordinary contributions to the development of the International Centre for Theoretical Physics during its budding years, both at its scientific and organizational fronts.

== See also ==
- Continuous spontaneous localization model

== Books ==
- Giancarlo Ghirardi (2007). Sneaking a Look at God's Cards: Unraveling the Mysteries of Quantum Mechanics. Translated by Gerald Malsbary. Princeton: Princeton University Press. ISBN 978-0-691-13037-8.
- Shyam Wuppuluri, Giancarlo Ghirardi (2017). Space, Time and the Limits of Human Understanding. The Frontiers Collection. Cham, Switzerland: Springer. doi:10.1007/978-3-319-44418-5. ISBN 978-3-319-44417-8.
