= 373P/Rinner =

Jupiter-family comet

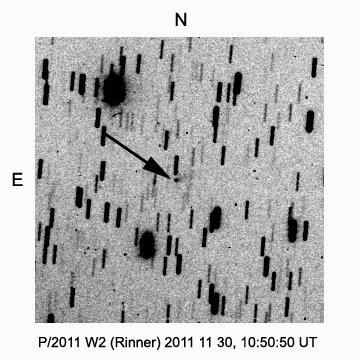
- Comet 373P/Rinner photographed by Charles Bell on 30 November 2011.

Discovery
- Discovered by: Claudine Rinner
- Discovery site: Oukaïmeden, Morocco
- Discovery date: 28 November 2011

Designations
- MPC designation: P/2011 W2, P/2018 R2
- Alternative designations: PK11W020

Orbital characteristics
- Epoch: 21 November 2025 (JD 2459200.5)
- Observation arc: 7.34 years (Note: Observation arc from the Minor Planet Center database covering dates from 28 November 2011 until 1 April 2019.)
- Number of observations: 921
- Aphelion: 5.297 AU
- Perihelion: 2.313 AU
- Semi-major axis: 3.805 AU
- Eccentricity: 0.39217
- Orbital period: 7.421 years
- Inclination: 13.760°
- Longitude of ascending node: 231.95°
- Argument of periapsis: 221.13°
- Mean anomaly: 82.10°
- Last perihelion: 5 September 2026
- Next perihelion: 14 January 2034
- T_{Jupiter}: 2.895
- Earth MOID: 1.341 AU
- Jupiter MOID: 0.449 AU

Physical characteristics
- Mean radius: <2.2 km (1.4 mi)
- Comet total magnitude (M1): 6.0
- Comet nuclear magnitude (M2): 15.3

373P/Rinner is a Jupiter-family comet with a 7.4-year orbit around the Sun. It is the first comet discovered by French astronomer, Claudine Rinner, (Note: Claudine Rinner would later discover two other comets, C/2012 CH_{17} (MOSS) and 281P/MOSS. However, 373P is so far the only comet named after her.) and the first comet discovery from France since C/1997 J2 (Meunier–Dupouy). It was last observed in 2019 and came to perihelion in September 2026. It will return to perihelion in 2034.

== Observational history ==
The comet was first discovered on CCD images taken from the Oukaïmeden Observatory on 28 November 2011. Claudine Rinner noted a faint tail about an arcminute in length, nearly an 18th-magnitude object in the constellation Canis Minor. (Note: Reported initial position upon discovery was: α = 7^{h} 57^{m} 45.14^{s}, δ = 5° 36′ 54.5″) Additional observations across the globe in the following days would later confirm the existence of Rinner's comet, which was subsequently designated as P/2011 W2. Gareth V. Williams provided the comet's preliminary orbital elements on the Minor Planet Center's site, which indicated it is in a roughly 10-year periodic orbit around the Sun.

Krisztián Sárneczky and Róbert Szakáts recovered the comet from the Konkoly Observatory as P/2018 R2 on 14 September 2018, where its appearance were reported to be almost stellar-like in the images taken. Gareth V. Williams calculated the orbit that linked the comet's two apparitions in 2011 and 2019 respectively. The comet would later receive its official numerical designation, 373P, in December 2018 alongside 11 other comets.

== Physical characteristics ==
Observations from the Sierra Nevada Observatory (OSN) in Spain between December 2011 and January 2012 helped to determine the dust environment around the comet. Analysis of the photographic plates taken determined mass loss rate of 2.0 kg/s (4.4 lb/s) while it was 1.45 AU (217 million km) from the Sun. This is comparable to other comets with low activity like 115P/Maury and 157P/Tritton.

The low activity being produced from the comet had enabled astronomers to also determine the size of its nucleus, where it is estimated to be no greater than 2.2 km (1.4 mi) in radius.

== Notes ==
Numbered comets
Previous; 372P/McNaught	373P/Rinner	Next; 374P/Larson
