= 114P/Wiseman–Skiff =

Periodic comet

114P/Wiseman-Skiff
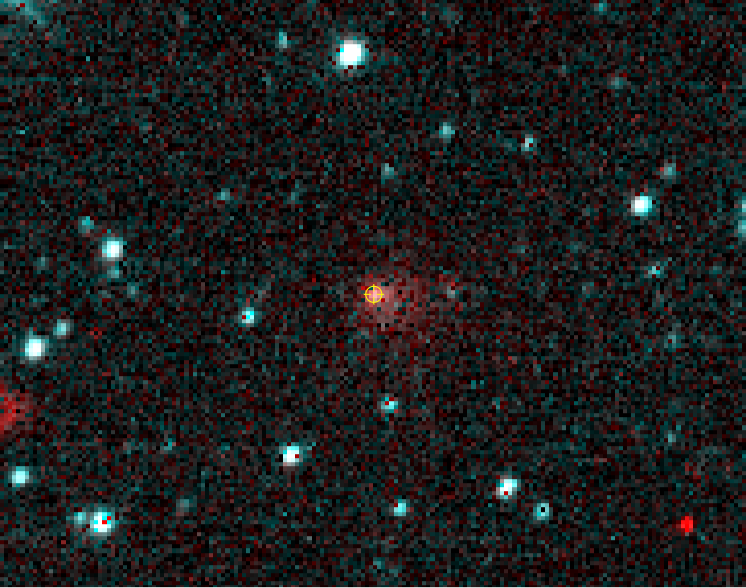
- Comet Wiseman–Skiff photographed by NEOWISE on 22 January 2020.

Discovery
- Discovered by: Jennifer Wiseman; Brian A. Skiff
- Discovery site: Lowell Observatory
- Discovery date: 28 December 1986

Designations
- MPC designation: P/1986 Y1, P/1993 X2
- Alternative designations: 1986 XV, 1993 IX; 1987b, 1993u

Orbital characteristics
- Epoch: 9 June 2026 (JD 2461200.5)
- Observation arc: 39.65 years (Note: Observation arc from the Minor Planet Center database covering dates from 28 December 1986 until 24 August 2026.)
- Number of observations: 2,275
- Aphelion: 5.506 AU
- Perihelion: 1.571 AU
- Semi-major axis: 3.538 AU
- Eccentricity: 0.55608
- Orbital period: 6.66 years
- Inclination: 18.303°
- Longitude of ascending node: 271.02°
- Argument of periapsis: 172.85°
- Mean anomaly: 345.49°
- Last perihelion: 15 September 2026
- Next perihelion: 3 May 2033
- T_{Jupiter}: 2.772
- Earth MOID: 0.597 AU
- Jupiter MOID: 0.184 AU

Physical characteristics
- Mean radius: 0.78 ± 0.05 km (0.485 ± 0.031 mi)
- Mean density: 500±70 kg/m^{3}
- Geometric albedo: 0.04 (assumed)
- Spectral type: (V–R) = 0.46±0.02; (B–V) = 0.85±0.03; (R–I) = 0.54±0.02
- Comet total magnitude (M1): 13.9
- Comet nuclear magnitude (M2): 16.3

114P/Wiseman–Skiff is a Jupiter-family comet with a 6.7-year orbit around the Sun. It is the only comet discovered by Jennifer Wiseman and one of several by Brian A. Skiff. It last came to perihelion on 15 September 2026 when it brightened to about apparent magnitude 16. It will return to perihelion on 3 May 2033.

== Observations ==
It was discovered by Jennifer Wiseman in January 1987 on two photographic plates that had been taken on 28 December 1986, by Brian A. Skiff of Lowell Observatory. Wiseman and Skiff confirmed the comet on 19 January 1987.

Aphelion is located near the orbit of Jupiter. Around 19 July 2149 ± 1 day, the comet will pass about 0.157 AU (23.5 million km) from Jupiter.

Based on observations conducted by the Hubble Space Telescope, the nucleus of Comet Wiseman–Skiff has a radius of 0.78±0.05 km, assuming a geometric albedo of 0.04.

Comet 114P/Wiseman–Skiff is believed to have been the parent body of a meteor shower on Mars, and the source of the first meteor photographed from the planet, which was taken by NASA's Spirit rover on 7 March 2004.

== Notes ==
Numbered comets
Previous; 113P/Spitaler	114P/Wiseman–Skiff	Next; 115P/Maury
