= Claudine Rinner =

French astronomer

- Born: 1965 (age 60–61)
- Known for: astronomy

Minor planets discovered: 393
see § List of discovered minor planets

Claudine Rinner (born 1965) is a French amateur astronomer from Ottmarsheim in Alsace, France. She is an observer at Ottmarsheim Observatory (224) and a discoverer of minor planets and comets, who received the Edgar Wilson Award for her discoveries.

== Career ==
A participant in the Morocco Oukaimeden Sky Survey (MOSS), Rinner discovered three comets using a 0.5-metre robotic telescope at Oukaïmeden Observatory located in Morocco. She won the 2013 Edgar Wilson Award for discovering three comets which were designated 373P/Rinner (P/2011 W2), C/2012 CH_{17} (MOSS), and 281P/MOSS (P/2013 CE_{31}). Rinner is also credited by the Minor Planet Center with the discovery of more than 100 minor planets since 2004, including several co-discoveries with François Kugel (see list below).

=== Awards and honors ===
The asteroid 23999 Rinner, discovered by French amateur astronomer Laurent Bernasconi in 1999, was named in her honor. The official naming citation was published by the Minor Planet Center on 21 July 2005 (M.P.C. 54566).

In 2020, she and Michel Ory jointly received the Dorothea Klumpke – Isaac Roberts prize from the Société astronomique de France.

== Discoveries ==
=== List of discovered minor planets ===
Some of Claudine Rinner's discoveries were made in collaboration with:

- ^{A} François Kugel
- ^{B} Philippe Dupouy

90533 Laurentblind	28 March 2004	list
120375 Kugel	10 August 2005	list
128627 Ottmarsheim	6 September 2004	list
133892 Benkhaldoun	7 September 2004	list
145566 Andreasphilipp	25 July 2006	list
152320 Lichtenknecker	27 October 2005	list
(152472) 2005 WZ_{3}	23 November 2005	list
157541 Wachter	27 October 2005	list
158913 Kreider	9 September 2004	list
164587 Taesch	17 July 2007	list
(168127) 2006 GC_{3}	6 April 2006	list
(175402) 2006 OL_{10}	25 July 2006	list
178014 Meslay	1 September 2006	list
184318 Fosanelli	2 April 2005	list
(185309) 2006 UN_{291}	27 October 2006	list
196945 Guerin	26 October 2003	list
(197872) 2004 RK_{8}	6 September 2004	list
(198897) 2005 UZ_{7}	26 October 2005	list
(198973) 2005 VO_{3}	6 November 2005	list
(198974) 2005 VN_{4}	6 November 2005	list
(199633) 2006 GF_{3}	7 April 2006	list
200020 Cadi Ayyad	14 July 2007	list
214485 Dupouy	26 October 2005	list
(221175) 2005 UR_{7}	26 October 2005	list
(227337) 2005 UH_{8}	27 October 2005	list

(227749) 2006 HG_{58}	21 April 2006	list
(229441) 2005 UJ_{8}	27 October 2005	list
(229504) 2005 WA_{4}	23 November 2005	list
(236492) 2006 GG_{3}	7 April 2006	list
(245552) 2005 UF_{8}	27 October 2005	list
(255072) 2005 UP_{8}	27 October 2005	list
(261214) 2005 UO_{7}	26 October 2005	list
(262587) 2006 VD_{95}	15 November 2006	list
(277936) 2006 OO	18 July 2006	list
(280813) 2005 UQ_{7}	26 October 2005	list
(280879) 2005 WB_{4}	23 November 2005	list
(281069) 2006 OO_{10}	25 July 2006	list
(290773) 2005 VL_{3}	6 November 2005	list
(290774) 2005 VM_{4}	6 November 2005	list
(295790) 2008 UP_{255}	6 September 2004	list
(308507) 2005 US_{7}	26 October 2005	list
(309208) 2007 HZ_{14}	22 April 2007	list
(311402) 2005 UU_{7}	26 October 2005	list
(318903) 2005 UQ_{8}	27 October 2005	list
340579 Losse	6 August 2006	list
(354758) 2005 UB_{8}	26 October 2005	list
355022 Triman	31 August 2006	list
355029 Herve	1 September 2006	list
(358482) 2007 RL	1 September 2007	list^{[A]}
(360008) 2012 YR	12 September 2007	list^{[A]}

(363952) 2005 UE_{8}	27 October 2005	list
(367066) 2006 OP_{10}	25 July 2006	list
(371386) 2006 RE	1 September 2006	list
(371568) 2006 VC_{95}	15 November 2006	list
(376516) 2012 LH_{8}	9 August 2007	list^{[A]}
(391057) 2005 UW_{7}	26 October 2005	list
(397027) 2005 UM_{8}	27 October 2005	list
(417130) 2005 VO_{4}	7 November 2005	list
(440793) 2006 OK_{10}	25 July 2006	list
(475017) 2005 UC_{8}	26 October 2005	list
(475781) 2006 XU_{1}	10 December 2006	list
(476528) 2008 GX_{111}	15 March 2008	list^{[A]}
(482306) 2011 UL_{126}	11 February 2008	list^{[A]}
(508535) 2016 RF_{45}	6 February 2014	list
(537605) 2015 PD_{58}	27 October 2010	list^{[A]}
(542171) 2013 AG_{15}	7 October 2012	list
(542331) 2013 CY_{21}	4 February 2013	list
(542338) 2013 CR_{27}	4 February 2013	list
(542341) 2013 CR_{31}	5 February 2013	list
(542354) 2013 CN_{48}	18 January 2013	list
(542355) 2013 CP_{48}	6 February 2013	list
(542491) 2013 DQ	16 February 2013	list
(542575) 2013 EO_{119}	23 December 2008	list^{[A]}
(542618) 2013 GO_{18}	14 December 2007	list^{[A]}
(543084) 2013 SD_{28}	5 September 2007	list^{[A]}

(543086) 2013 SW_{28}	30 September 2013	list
(545129) 2014 YF_{62}	6 October 2013	list
(545226) 2011 CD_{71}	9 February 2011	list^{[A]}
(545228) 2011 CK_{78}	8 February 2011	list^{[A]}
(545360) 2011 GP_{60}	9 April 2011	list^{[A]}
(546196) 2010 TV_{194}	14 October 2010	list^{[A]}
(546968) 2010 BR_{1}	18 January 2010	list^{[A]}
(546970) 2010 BE_{2}	18 January 2010	list^{[A]}
(547171) 2010 EB_{66}	13 March 2010	list^{[A]}
(547206) 2010 FV_{6}	17 March 2010	list^{[A]}
(547416) 2010 RJ_{75}	8 September 2010	list^{[A]}
(548682) 2010 UQ_{10}	20 December 2006	list
(549752) 2011 SQ_{146}	25 August 2011	list^{[A]}
(550034) 2011 YA_{4}	22 December 2011	list
(551086) 2012 VP_{85}	12 October 2012	list
(551119) 2012 WQ_{24}	23 November 2012	list
(551391) 2013 CK_{51}	7 February 2013	list
(551393) 2013 CO_{58}	9 February 2013	list
(551537) 2013 ED_{114}	16 February 2013	list
(552102) 2013 TJ_{12}	5 October 2013	list
(553458) 2011 QZ_{39}	28 August 2011	list^{[A]}
(553819) 2011 YW_{3}	21 December 2011	list
(554116) 2012 LZ_{11}	14 June 2012	list
(554488) 2012 TP_{355}	12 October 2012	list
(554819) 2013 CN_{57}	9 February 2013	list

(554829) 2013 CN_{93}	27 August 2011	list^{[A]}
(555182) 2013 SW_{25}	28 September 2013	list
(555245) 2013 TM_{134}	12 October 2013	list
(555448) 2013 YN_{21}	14 November 2013	list
(557665) 2014 WR_{109}	25 October 2014	list
(558748) 2015 BQ_{119}	28 December 2008	list^{[A]}
(559994) 2015 FX_{2}	10 November 2013	list
(562775) 2016 AM_{222}	10 November 2010	list^{[A]}
(562953) 2016 BA_{18}	26 February 2012	list
(563818) 2016 ER_{87}	23 December 2008	list^{[A]}
(566894) 2018 VM_{59}	27 December 2013	list
(571437) 2007 RT_{5}	5 September 2007	list^{[A]}
(573140) 2008 YT_{6}	22 December 2008	list^{[A]}
(573273) 2009 BM_{71}	21 January 2009	list^{[A]}
(573367) 2009 DN_{2}	16 February 2009	list^{[A]}
(573379) 2009 DC_{40}	20 February 2009	list^{[A]}
(573619) 2009 JV_{20}	28 February 2014	list
(574105) 2010 CZ_{18}	12 February 2010	list^{[A]}
(574478) 2010 RS_{43}	9 August 2010	list^{[A]}
(574503) 2010 RU_{90}	10 September 2010	list^{[A]}
(574661) 2010 TG_{169}	14 September 2010	list^{[A]}
(574971) 2011 EK_{20}	6 March 2011	list^{[A]}
(575272) 2011 QA_{40}	28 August 2011	list^{[A]}
(575932) 2011 YP_{56}	14 December 2007	list^{[A]}
(577050) 2013 AK_{15}	3 January 2013	list

(577278) 2013 CD_{57}	8 February 2013	list
(577796) 2013 QZ_{68}	22 August 2009	list^{[A]}
(577809) 2013 RL	1 September 2013	list
(577866) 2013 SX_{25}	28 September 2013	list
(577867) 2013 SX_{28}	30 September 2013	list
(577941) 2013 TG_{129}	6 October 2013	list
(578058) 2013 WL_{5}	30 September 2013	list
(580077) 2015 AK_{263}	6 October 2012	list
(582015) 2015 MX_{160}	6 February 2014	list
(582432) 2015 TE_{350}	11 October 2015	list
(583724) 2016 NQ_{69}	20 February 2009	list^{[A]}
(584530) 2017 GY_{10}	17 July 2007	list^{[A]}
(584705) 2017 QD_{31}	9 November 2013	list
(584807) 2017 RH_{37}	13 October 2013	list
(585109) 2017 UO_{12}	16 October 2012	list
(588146) 2007 RV_{18}	12 September 2007	list^{[A]}
(588208) 2007 TQ_{6}	6 October 2007	list^{[A]}
(589218) 2009 PN_{1}	14 August 2009	list^{[A]}
(589229) 2009 QW_{26}	22 August 2009	list^{[A]}
(591076) 2013 CW_{57}	9 February 2013	list
(591279) 2013 GO_{55}	14 October 2010	list^{[A]}
(591443) 2013 SK_{25}	27 September 2013	list
(591821) 2014 EA_{249}	6 March 2014	list
(593680) 2015 TY_{205}	10 October 2015	list
(594429) 2016 UB_{71}	10 October 2016	list

(598007) 2008 CS6_{9}	8 February 2008	list^{[A]}
(600109) 2011 JK_{2}	4 May 2011	list^{[A]}
(600282) 2011 SU_{231}	6 September 2007	list^{[A]}
(601202) 2012 XG_{136}	13 December 2012	list
(601237) 2013 AG_{2}	3 January 2013	list
(601353) 2013 CA_{29}	5 February 2013	list
(601986) 2014 AR_{12}	3 January 2014	list
(602057) 2014 CF_{25}	6 February 2014	list
(602383) 2014 HX_{205}	29 April 2014	list
(602407) 2014 JF_{29}	7 February 2013	list
(604648) 2015 TY_{22}	6 October 2015	list
(604986) 2015 XO_{303}	11 April 2013	list
(606413) 2017 XO_{16}	13 December 2011	list
(606719) 2018 VW_{10}	27 December 2013	list
(606798) 2019 CJ_{8}	10 September 2010	list^{[A]}
(609224) 2004 VQ_{132}	28 February 2014	list
(620791) 2006 QU_{23}	21 August 2006	list^{[B]}
(621702) 2010 BT_{1}	18 January 2010	list^{[A]}
(622696) 2014 QO_{366}	29 July 2009	list^{[A]}
(623022) 2015 FF_{355}	14 August 2009	list^{[A]}
(626505) 2007 SO_{26}	10 November 2013	list
(631558) 2007 RS_{5}	5 September 2007	list^{[A]}
(632866) 2008 YV_{33}	28 December 2008	list^{[A]}
(632987) 2009 BT_{72}	29 January 2009	list^{[A]}
(633288) 2009 OA_{8}	24 July 2009	list^{[A]}

(633296) 2009 PS	13 August 2009	list^{[A]}
(633841) 2010 ED_{189}	4 January 2014	list
(634372) 2011 OZ_{10}	29 January 2009	list^{[A]}
(634398) 2011 QM_{18}	21 August 2011	list^{[A]}
(634651) 2012 DY_{40}	26 February 2012	list
(634800) 2012 PX_{23}	17 January 2010	list^{[A]}
(635094) 2012 XF_{93}	15 November 2012	list
(635214) 2013 CR_{9}	2 February 2013	list
(635218) 2013 CA_{15}	17 February 2009	list^{[A]}
(636152) 2014 OR_{349}	22 August 2009	list^{[A]}
(636534) 2014 TV_{14}	8 February 2011	list^{[A]}
(636754) 2014 WE_{263}	5 March 2011	list^{[A]}
(643743) 2006 QJ_{144}	31 August 2006	list
(645494) 2007 TB_{21}	9 October 2007	list^{[A]}
(647072) 2008 PZ_{2}	3 August 2008	list^{[A]}
(647075) 2008 PU_{17}	11 August 2008	list^{[A]}
(647083) 2008 QN_{6}	25 August 2008	list^{[A]}
(647813) 2008 YQ_{6}	22 December 2008	list^{[A]}
(647814) 2008 YW_{6}	23 December 2008	list^{[A]}
(648167) 2009 QF_{10}	21 August 2009	list^{[A]}
(648873) 2010 PW_{22}	8 August 2010	list^{[A]}
(648896) 2010 RG_{67}	5 September 2010	list^{[A]}
(649179) 2010 XO_{118}	2 December 2010	list^{[A]}
(651216) 2012 XS_{49}	5 December 2012	list
(651533) 2013 CS_{30}	5 February 2013	list

(651836) 2013 HF_{5}	11 April 2013	list
(652611) 2014 DZ_{96}	3 January 2013	list
(653275) 2014 NK_{10}	11 September 2010	list^{[A]}
(656238) 2015 XO_{380}	13 December 2015	list
(658558) 2017 SG_{63}	17 September 2017	list
(663477) 2007 PR_{32}	9 August 2007	list^{[A]}
(663482) 2007 PG_{54}	8 August 2007	list^{[A]}
(664444) 2008 QT_{2}	23 August 2008	list^{[A]}
(664445) 2008 QC_{6}	25 August 2008	list^{[A]}
(664455) 2008 QT_{18}	29 August 2008	list^{[A]}
(665088) 2008 YJ_{26}	23 December 2008	list^{[A]}
(665089) 2008 YN_{26}	23 December 2008	list^{[A]}
(665471) 2009 PZ	13 August 2009	list^{[A]}
(665497) 2009 QY_{10}	22 August 2009	list^{[A]}
(665940) 2009 VK_{25}	10 November 2009	list^{[A]}
(666505) 2010 PR_{22}	8 August 2010	list^{[A]}
(666506) 2010 PV_{22}	8 August 2010	list^{[A]}
(666561) 2010 RF_{67}	5 September 2010	list^{[A]}
(666564) 2010 RU_{74}	5 September 2010	list^{[A]}
(667081) 2011 BQ_{14}	25 January 2011	list^{[A]}
(667216) 2011 CM_{91}	9 August 2007	list^{[A]}
(668422) 2011 XY_{4}	10 October 2016	list
(668646) 2012 DC_{38}	26 February 2012	list
(669232) 2012 TW_{315}	7 October 2012	list
(669572) 2013 AX_{1}	2 January 2013	list

(669780) 2013 CZ_{28}	5 February 2013	list
(669840) 2013 CP_{127}	14 February 2013	list
(669883) 2013 CH_{182}	5 February 2013	list
(670070) 2013 FH_{15}	22 August 2009	list^{[A]}
(670291) 2013 LH_{9}	3 February 2012	list
(670541) 2013 TK_{116}	1 September 2013	list
(670546) 2013 TW_{137}	7 October 2013	list
(670572) 2013 TK_{182}	12 October 2013	list
(673649) 2015 EW_{64}	5 April 2010	list^{[A]}
(674290) 2015 NO_{28}	7 March 2014	list
(676878) 2016 PM_{118}	7 March 2014	list
(679602) 2019 SH_{74}	1 January 2017	list
(681272) 2004 VR_{69}	14 November 2004	list
(683143) 2007 RH	1 September 2007	list^{[A]}
(684823) 2008 YW_{3}	21 December 2008	list^{[A]}
(684824) 2008 YU_{4}	22 December 2008	list^{[A]}
(685845) 2010 BE_{3}	18 January 2010	list^{[A]}
(688176) 2012 LN_{26}	17 July 2007	list^{[A]}
(689005) 2013 CE_{29}	5 February 2013	list
(690166) 2014 AS_{74}	3 January 2014	list
(691606) 2014 QV_{259}	11 April 2013	list
(692779) 2015 BG_{213}	26 December 2014	list
(694278) 2015 RB_{90}	14 August 2009	list^{[A]}
(694967) 2015 UE_{28}	11 January 2013	list
(695229) 2015 WV_{19}	21 August 2014	list

(696944) 2016 TM_{89}	2 October 2016	list^{[A]}
(697235) 2016 YF_{34}	29 December 2016	list^{[A]}
(699139) 2019 JJ_{9}	9 February 2013	list^{[A]}
(700266) 2000 WF_{198}	22 September 2009	list^{[A]}
(703376) 2007 RR_{14}	11 September 2007	list^{[A]}
(703557) 2007 TA_{21}	9 October 2007	list^{[A]}
(704493) 2008 OU_{8}	29 July 2008	list^{[A]}
(704512) 2008 PP_{13}	10 August 2008	list^{[A]}
(704536) 2008 RP_{27}	8 September 2008	list^{[A]}
(705297) 2008 YC_{8}	23 December 2008	list^{[A]}
(705551) 2009 DD_{40}	20 February 2009	list^{[A]}
(706682) 2010 RO_{62}	5 September 2010	list^{[A]}
(707254) 2011 CV_{70}	9 February 2011	list^{[A]}
(708528) 2012 EX_{1}	2 March 2012	list
(708970) 2012 TL_{34}	7 October 2012	list
(709572) 2013 CL_{119}	8 February 2013	list
(710395) 2013 TR_{134}	12 October 2013	list
(710552) 2013 YA_{129}	7 September 2008	list^{[A]}
(711178) 2014 KG_{69}	4 February 2013	list
(711841) 2014 QV_{304}	23 August 2014	list
(712709) 2014 WD_{68}	8 August 2010	list^{[A]}
(713108) 2015 AU_{11}	13 October 2013	list
(714579) 2015 PZ_{20}	6 March 2014	list
(718044) 2017 DM_{13}	9 February 2013	list
(723848) 2007 RU_{5}	5 September 2007	list^{[A]}

(725110) 2008 UP_{5}	25 October 2008	list^{[A]}
(725468) 2008 YS_{6}	22 December 2008	list^{[A]}
(725475) 2008 YK_{26}	23 December 2008	list^{[A]}
(726764) 2010 BY_{107}	14 May 2010	list^{[A]}
(727376) 2010 GM_{69}	7 February 2010	list^{[A]}
(727521) 2010 HG_{53}	29 August 2008	list^{[A]}
(727856) 2010 KD_{25}	22 December 2008	list^{[A]}
(729024) 2010 XT_{101}	29 December 2016	list
(731286) 2013 CU_{126}	8 February 2013	list
(732043) 2013 WO_{21}	20 February 2010	list^{[A]}
(733257) 2014 QS_{224}	23 August 2007	list^{[A]}
(735794) 2015 MZ_{68}	20 February 2009	list^{[A]}
(736836) 2015 XK_{191}	30 July 2014	list
(739356) 2017 PP_{41}	1 August 2008	list^{[A]}
(742270) 2007 RY_{5}	5 September 2007	list^{[A]}
(742271) 2007 RS_{14}	11 September 2007	list^{[A]}
(742404) 2007 SO_{1}	19 September 2007	list^{[A]}
(742412) 2007 TM_{6}	6 October 2007	list^{[A]}
(743227) 2008 PR_{12}	1 August 2008	list^{[A]}
(744155) 2009 DE_{40}	20 February 2009	list^{[A]}
(744228) 2009 FX_{2}	18 March 2009	list^{[A]}
(745507) 2011 CS_{69}	7 February 2011	list^{[A]}
(745965) 2011 QO_{21}	25 August 2011	list^{[A]}
(746118) 2011 SS_{210}	6 October 2007	list^{[A]}
(747003) 2012 OP_{2}	24 July 2012	list

(747134) 2012 ST_{41}	1 August 2008	list^{[A]}
(747183) 2012 TD_{58}	7 October 2012	list
(747337) 2012 TS_{359}	15 October 2012	list
(747895) 2013 CS_{9}	16 December 2012	list
(747913) 2013 CQ_{50}	6 February 2013	list
(747916) 2013 CE_{57}	9 February 2013	list
(747937) 2013 CY_{101}	17 January 2013	list
(747953) 2013 CQ_{127}	14 February 2013	list
(747960) 2013 CU_{133}	15 February 2013	list
(748639) 2013 TR_{133}	12 October 2013	list
(748774) 2013 WQ_{58}	13 August 2009	list^{[A]}
(748806) 2013 XH_{9}	14 October 2013	list
(748955) 2014 BG_{62}	3 January 2014	list
(750846) 2014 YL_{28}	19 September 2007	list^{[A]}
(751977) 2015 KH_{50}	5 March 2011	list^{[A]}
(753696) 2016 CE_{243}	6 April 2011	list^{[A]}
(754897) 2016 UB_{149}	15 November 2012	list
(756407) 2019 HA_{1}	3 February 2012	list
(759616) 2007 XL_{67}	4 February 2013	list
(760102) 2008 PM_{14}	10 August 2008	list^{[A]}
(761770) 2010 PQ_{22}	7 August 2010	list^{[A]}
(762830) 2011 PF_{1}	2 August 2011	list^{[A]}
(763953) 2012 TM_{34}	7 October 2012	list
(764265) 2012 VJ_{72}	12 October 2012	list
(765246) 2013 TP_{197}	7 October 2013	list

(765265) 2013 TD_{207}	14 October 2013	list
(769814) 2015 TY_{153}	27 August 2011	list^{[A]}
(772621) 2017 SW_{47}	12 October 2013	list
(776073) 2007 TG_{171}	12 October 2007	list^{[A]}
(776956) 2008 HP_{66}	15 March 2008	list^{[A]}
(781116) 2013 CP_{133}	15 February 2013	list
(781911) 2013 UN_{14}	28 September 2013	list
(782308) 2014 CF_{15}	6 February 2014	list
(783324) 2014 QM_{453}	21 August 2014	list
(789246) 2017 PQ_{27}	14 August 2017	list
(794909) 2007 SO_{30}	20 September 2007	list^{[A]}
(795639) 2008 OG_{14}	31 July 2008	list^{[A]}
(795649) 2008 QW_{24}	30 August 2008	list^{[A]}
(796082) 2009 DO_{2}	16 February 2009	list^{[A]}
(796223) 2009 PF_{1}	13 August 2009	list^{[A]}
(796227) 2009 QB_{10}	21 August 2009	list^{[A]}
(796720) 2010 PS_{22}	8 August 2010	list^{[A]}
(797346) 2011 EC_{47}	10 March 2011	list^{[A]}
(799759) 2013 TS_{138}	12 October 2013	list
(803865) 2015 TE_{23}	6 October 2015	list
(812166) 2003 WC_{203}	9 October 2010	list^{[A]}
(815075) 2009 QX_{26}	22 August 2009	list^{[A]}
(815699) 2010 PJ_{23}	8 August 2010	list^{[A]}
(815981) 2010 XS_{16}	21 August 2006	list^{[B]}
(816176) 2011 CF_{67}	3 February 2011	list^{[A]}

(816369) 2011 GO_{2}	1 April 2011	list^{[A]}
(816452) 2011 JL_{2}	4 May 2011	list^{[A]}
(817437) 2012 PP_{25}	14 August 2012	list
(818048) 2013 CV_{51}	7 February 2013	list
(818418) 2013 RQ	1 September 2013	list
(818490) 2013 SV_{25}	28 September 2013	list
(818558) 2013 TW_{134}	12 October 2013	list
(822002) 2015 NG_{18}	5 December 2012	list
(824189) 2016 TW_{77}	10 October 2016	list
(824203) 2016 TU_{101}	10 October 2016	list
(824848) 2017 KJ_{34}	23 March 2017	list
(825079) 2017 SR_{88}	18 September 2017	list
(825158) 2017 TB_{6}	10 November 2009	list^{[A]}
(825726) 2018 SR_{6}	18 November 2009	list^{[A]}
(825839) 2018 XY_{25}	4 December 2018	list
(826509) 2020 UD_{8}	12 January 2013	list
(831099) 2008 YL_{26}	23 December 2008	list^{[A]}
(831158) 2009 BD_{5}	17 January 2009	list^{[A]}
(832074) 2010 BQ_{1}	18 January 2010	list^{[A]}
(832323) 2010 CA_{19}	12 February 2010	list^{[A]}
(832904) 2010 GW_{6}	4 April 2010	list^{[A]}
(834738) 2010 TR_{119}	9 October 2010	list^{[A]}
(836508) 2012 SR_{57}	26 September 2012	list
(837028) 2012 YT_{1}	16 December 2012	list
(837180) 2013 CJ_{231}	5 February 2013	list

(837717) 2013 TH_{12}	5 October 2013	list
(837826) 2013 TV_{244}	6 October 2013	list
(840600) 2015 BH_{336}	13 October 2013	list
(842180) 2015 TB_{200}	6 September 2004	list
(845350) 2017 US_{32}	1 September 2013	list
(845872) 2018 MM_{27}	1 January 2017	list
(850974) 2007 TB_{67}	12 October 2007	list^{[A]}
(852011) 2008 QU_{2}	23 August 2008	list^{[A]}
(852015) 2008 QY_{24}	30 August 2008	list^{[A]}
(857818) 2012 TW_{130}	7 October 2012	list
(858815) 2013 CK_{204}	5 February 2013	list
(859915) 2013 TX_{128}	5 October 2013	list
(862249) 2014 QP_{152}	21 August 2014	list
(862400) 2014 QW_{304}	23 August 2014	list
(869083) 2016 NC_{33}	17 September 2009	list^{[A]}
(869843) 2016 TF_{101}	1 October 2016	list
(872126) 2018 AR_{10}	7 March 2014	list
(872743) 2018 TT_{14}	13 October 2018	list
(877939) 2011 PH_{1}	2 August 2011	list^{[A]}
(878884) 2013 CO_{60}	5 February 2013	list
(880164) 2014 RW_{46}	6 September 2014	list
(883628) 2016 TJ_{87}	10 October 2016	list
(884484) 2017 QT	16 August 2017	list
(884629) 2017 SY_{212}	16 September 2017	list
(880164) 2014 RW_{46}	6 September 2014	list

(883628) 2016 TJ_{87}	10 October 2016	list
(884484) 2017 QT	16 August 2017	list
(884629) 2017 SY_{212}	16 September 2017	list

== See also ==
- List of minor planet discoverers § C. Rinner
