= Rabat Observatory =

Astronomical observatory in Morocco

- Location: Rabat, Rabat Prefecture, Rabat-Salé-Kénitra, Morocco
- Coordinates: 33°55′30″N 6°45′30″W
- Location of Rabat Observatory

Rabat Observatory is an astronomical observatory located in Rabat, Morocco. It was founded in 1999 and has a 51-cm telescope. In addition to Oukaïmeden observatory, it is one of the main existing observatories in Morocco.

== See also ==
- List of astronomical observatories
- Oukaïmeden observatory
