= 116P/Wild =

Periodic comet with 6 year orbit

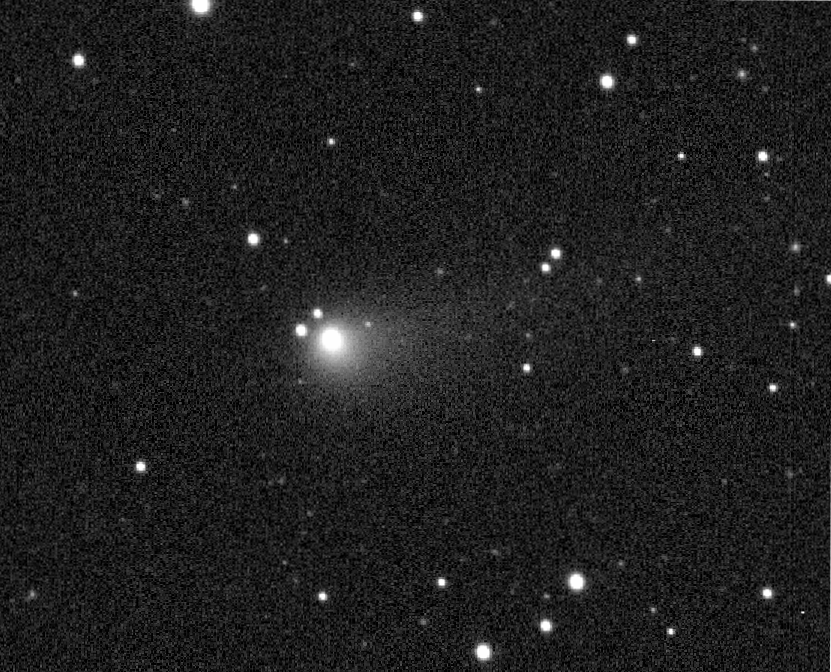
- Comet Wild 4 photographed by the Zwicky Transient Facility on 26 February 2022.

Discovery
- Discovered by: Paul Wild
- Discovery date: January 21, 1990

Designations
- MPC designation: P/1990 B1, P/1994 V1
- Alternative designations: 1990 X, 1990a, 1994v Wild 4

Orbital characteristics
- Epoch: 17 October 2024 (JD 2460600.5)
- Observation arc: 34.62 years
- Number of observations: 6,425
- Aphelion: 4.779 AU
- Perihelion: 2.195 AU
- Semi-major axis: 3.487 AU
- Eccentricity: 0.37401
- Orbital period: 6.511 years
- Inclination: 3.604°
- Longitude of ascending node: 20.965°
- Argument of periapsis: 173.18°
- Mean anomaly: 124.64°
- Last perihelion: 16 July 2022
- Next perihelion: 16 January 2029
- T_{Jupiter}: 3.009
- Earth MOID: 1.187 AU
- Jupiter MOID: 0.188 AU

Physical characteristics
- Mean radius: 3.0–3.5 km (1.9–2.2 mi)
- Comet total magnitude (M1): 7.6
- Comet nuclear magnitude (M2): 12.9

116P/Wild, also known as Wild 4, is a periodic comet in the Solar System. It fits the definition of an Encke-type comet with (T_{Jupiter} > 3; a < a_{Jupiter}).

On 4 November 2042, the comet will pass about 0.029 AU (4.3 million km; 2.7 million mi) from 1 Ceres.

Numbered comets
Previous; 115P/Maury	116P/Wild	Next; 117P/Helin–Roman–Alu
