= Philip Pearle =

American physicist

- Born: Philip Mark Pearle; September 24, 1936; Brooklyn, NY, US
- Education: Massachusetts Institute of Technology
- Known for: Continuous Spontaneous Localization (CSL) theory
- Spouse: Betty Deborah Cooper Pearle
- Scientific career
- Fields: Physics
- Workplaces: Harvard University; Case Institute; Hamilton College
- Thesis: (1963)
- Doctoral advisor: Kerson Huang

Philip Mark Pearle (born September 24, 1936) is an American physicist and professor of physics emeritus at Hamilton College, where he taught from 1969 to 2001.

He is known for his contributions to the foundations of quantum mechanics, particularly the development of the Continuous Spontaneous Localization (CSL) theory, designed to resolve the quantum measurement problem.

== Early life and education ==
Raised in New York City, he attended the Bronx High School of Science from 1949 to 1953. He studied electrical engineering at the Massachusetts Institute of Technology (MIT), in the cooperative program with Bell Labs, earning his B.S. in 1957 and M.S. in 1958, with a master’s thesis on ferroelectric barium titanate. He completed his Ph.D. in physics at MIT in 1963 with a dissertation on Feynman diagram summations and low-energy pion–nucleon scattering.

== Academic career ==
Pearle began his academic career as a teaching assistant at MIT from 1960 to 1963 and then served as an instructor at Harvard University from 1963 to 1966. He held an assistant professorship at Case Institute of Technology from 1966 to 1969 before joining Hamilton College, where he served as assistant professor from 1969 to 1972, associate professor (1972–1976), and professor (1976–2001). He chaired the Physics Department from 1984 to 1994 and was named Hamilton’s first Kenan Professor (1976–1979). Pearle became professor emeritus in 2001.

In addition to his long tenure at Hamilton College, Pearle has held numerous visiting and research positions at institutions including the University of Geneva (1973–74), the Mathematical Institute at Oxford (1981–82), the Universities of South Carolina, Cambridge, Pavia, Geneva, Durham, and Oxford (1987–94), the International Centre for Theoretical Physics in Trieste (1991–94), the Hebrew University of Jerusalem (1998), Oxford University’s Philosophy of Physics group (2000), the Institute for Advanced Study in Princeton (2003), and the Universidad Nacional Autónoma de México (2013).

== Research ==
A complete presentation of his main contribution, the CSL theory, is given in his 2024 monograph Introduction to Dynamical Wave Function Collapse. This book presents CSL as two equations, a modified linear Schrodinger equation that adds an extra, non-Hermitian, term to the Hamiltonian, dependent on a random field, together with a Probability Rule, which states that the probability of a particular random field is proportional to the squared norm of the state vector that evolves under that field. The book also provides an addendum that presents his original, equivalent, version of CSL, as a single, non-linear, Schrodinger stochastic differential equation (SDE). The introduction of SDE’s was another important contribution of Pearle.

Other frequently cited work include a paper on a Bell theorem "loophole," a monograph on the classical electron, earlier work on interpreting quantum theory, pre-CSL work on dynamical collapse, Aharonov-Bohm and Aharonov-Casher effects, Lindblad equation, Robert Brown and Brownian Motion. Pearle is the author of some frequently cited book reviews.

== Books ==
- Introduction to Dynamical Wave Function Collapse (Oxford University Press, Oxford, 2024).

== See also ==
- Continuous spontaneous localization model
