= 115P/Maury =

Jupiter-family comet

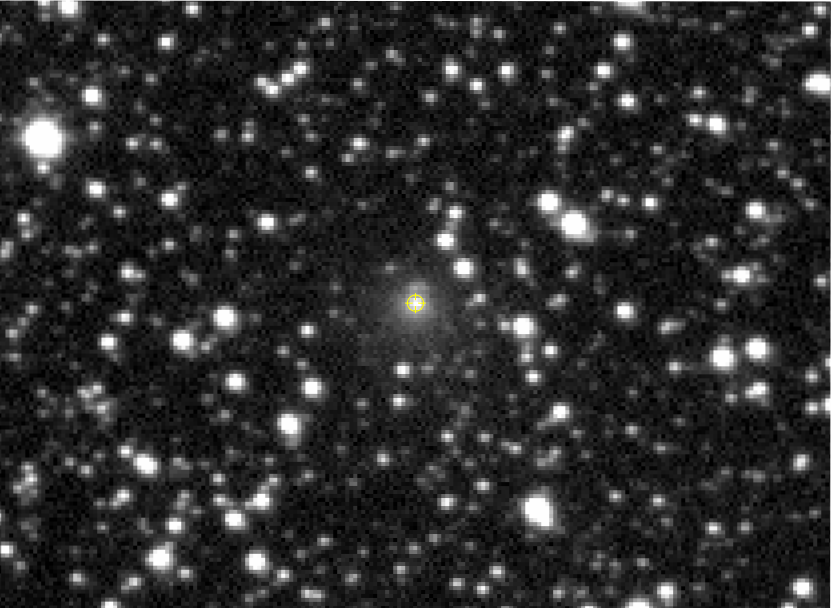
- Maury's Comet photographed from the Zwicky Transient Facility in 27 July 2020.

Discovery
- Discovered by: Alain J. Maury
- Discovery site: Palomar Observatory
- Discovery date: 16 August 1985

Designations
- MPC designation: P/1985 Q1, P/1994 J1
- Alternative designations: 1985 VI, 1994 VIII; 1985k, 1994h

Orbital characteristics
- Epoch: 25 February 2023 (JD 2460000.5)
- Observation arc: 35.39 years (Note: Observation arc from the Minor Planet Center database covering dates from 16 August 1985 until 8 January 2021.)
- Number of observations: 1,435
- Aphelion: 6.484 AU
- Perihelion: 2.059 AU
- Semi-major axis: 4.272 AU
- Eccentricity: 0.51796
- Orbital period: 8.83 years
- Inclination: 11.677°
- Longitude of ascending node: 176.01°
- Argument of periapsis: 121.00°
- Mean anomaly: 105.02°
- Last perihelion: 29 July 2020
- Next perihelion: 18 May 2029
- T_{Jupiter}: 2.736
- Earth MOID: 1.071 AU
- Jupiter MOID: 0.495 AU

Physical characteristics
- Mean radius: 1.11 km (0.69 mi)
- Mean density: 610±80 kg/m^{3}
- Geometric albedo: 0.04 (assumed)
- Comet total magnitude (M1): 13.0
- Comet nuclear magnitude (M2): 15.3

Comet Maury, also known as 115P/Maury, is a Jupiter-family comet with an 8.83-year orbit around the Sun. It is the first of nine comets discovered by French astronomer, Alain J. Maury. (Note: As of 2026, 115P remains the only comet that Alain J. Maury had independently discovered. All other eight were co-discovered with either J. Phinney, Georges Attard or the MAP Observations Program (MAPS))

== Observational history ==
Alain J. Maury discovered the comet while examining the photographic plates taken by James M. Schombert on the night of 16 August 1985. At the time, the comet was a diffuse 16th-magnitude object with a short tail located on the constellation Aquarius. (Note: Reported initial position upon discovery was: α = 21^{h} 52.7^{m} , δ = –1° 17′) Multiple follow-up observations from their colleagues at the Palomar Observatory between 20 and 23 August later confirmed its existence.

Additional observations up to October 1985 helped astronomers to conclude that the orbit of P/1985 Q1 had indicated it is a short-period comet, with an orbital period of roughly 8.84 years.

On 3 May 1994, James V. Scotti successfully recovered the comet from the Kitt Peak Observatory as P/1994 J1. The comet was later observed at the Keck Observatory while it was inactive at aphelion in December 1997, which allowed direct measurements of its nucleus to be conducted.

The comet was also observed during its 2002 and 2011 apparitions. A small apparent outburst was detected from the Zwicky Transient Facility (ZTF) during its 2020 apparition, where the comet temporarily brightened by 0.3 magnitudes between 19 and 23 June.

== Orbit ==
115P/Maury completes an orbit around the Sun roughly once every 8.83 years, inclined about 11.68 degrees from the ecliptic. Orbital calculations have shown that the comet is currently in a stable 4/3 resonance with Jupiter, where it had remained within the past few thousand years. Additional computations revealed that before 115P was locked into this resonance, it is likely a centaur with an orbit beyond Saturn, where multiple encounters with Jupiter had brought itself down to its present-day orbit.

== Physical characteristics ==
The nucleus of the comet has a radius of about 1.11 km (0.69 mi) based on observations by the Keck Observatory, assuming a geometric albedo of 0.04.

In July 2011, while it was 2.146 AU (321.0 million km) from the Sun, it was determined that 115P/Maury ejects a total mass of 6.9×10^{7} kg of material per year, indicating a mass loss rate of 2.1 kg/s (4.6 lb/s). This is similar to those from what was also observed from 157P/Tritton and 373P/Rinner, where these comets produce fairly weak activity on each apparition.

== See also ==
- C/2026 A1 (MAPS), a Kreutz sungrazer comet co-discovered by Alain Maury

== Notes ==
Numbered comets
Previous; 114P/Wiseman–Skiff	115P/Maury	Next; 116P/Wild
