= Jennifer Wiseman =

American astronomer

Jennifer J. Wiseman
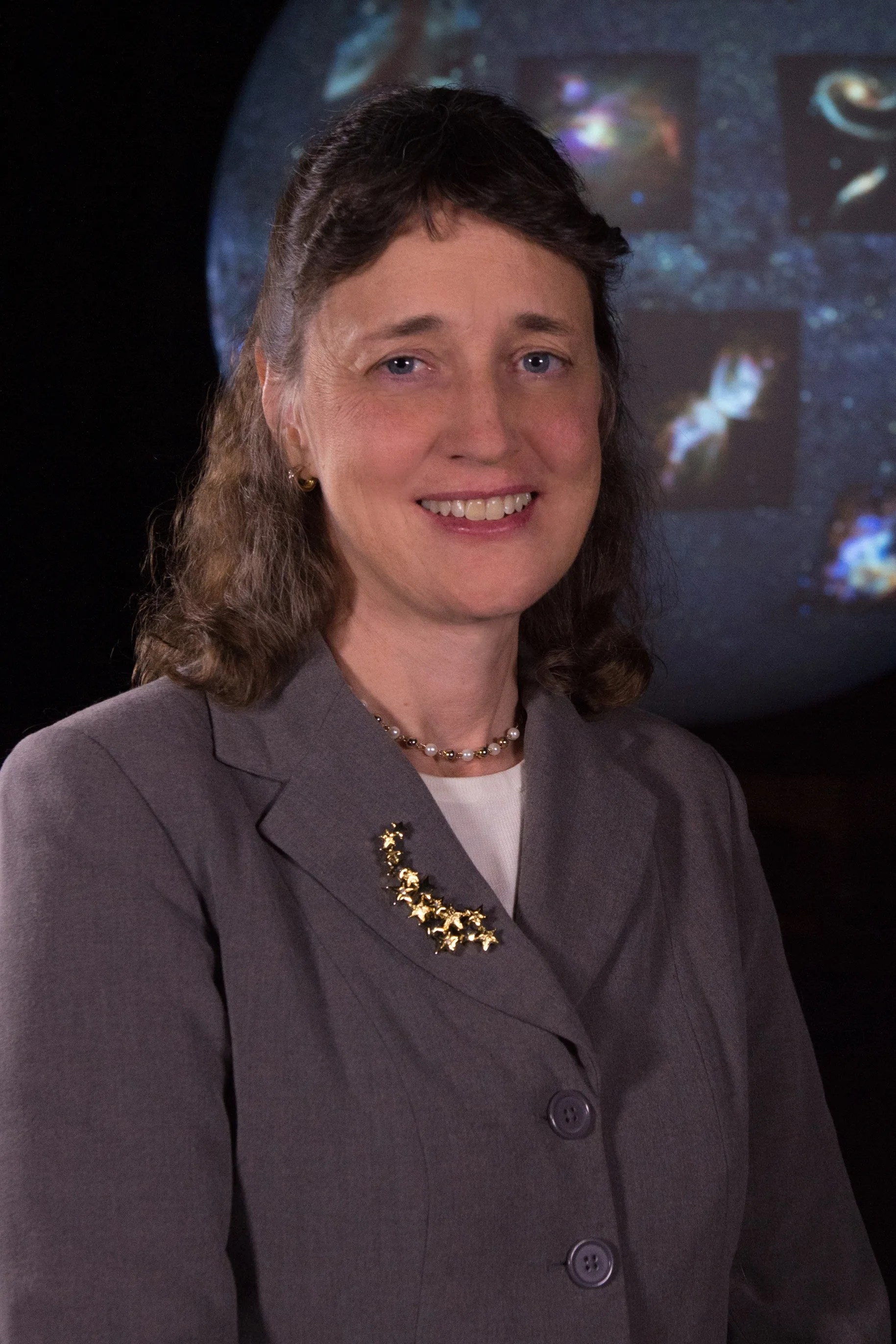
- Education: MIT; Harvard University
- Scientific career
- Fields: Astrophysics
- Workplaces: Johns Hopkins University; NASA Headquarters; NASA's Goddard Space Flight Center

Jennifer J. Wiseman is an American astronomer and Senior Project Scientist on the Hubble Space Telescope.

She was born into a rural community in Mountain Home, Arkansas. She earned a bachelor's degree in physics from MIT and a Ph.D. in Astronomy from Harvard University in 1995. Wiseman discovered periodic comet 114P/Wiseman-Skiff while working as an undergraduate search assistant in 1987. Wiseman is a senior astrophysicist at the NASA Goddard Space Flight Center, where she serves as the Senior Project Scientist for the Hubble Space Telescope. She previously headed the Laboratory for Exoplanets and Stellar Astrophysics. She studies star forming regions of our galaxy using radio, optical, and infrared telescopes, with a particular interest in molecular cloud cores, protostars, and outflows. She led a major study that mapped a star forming region in the constellation Orion.

Wiseman is also interested in science policy and public science outreach and engagement. She has served as a congressional science fellow of the American Physical Society, an elected councilor of the American Astronomical Society and a public dialogue leader for the American Association for the Advancement of Science. She gives talks on the excitement of astronomy and scientific discovery. She has appeared in many science and news venues including The New York Times, The Washington Post, NOVA and National Public Radio. She has been featured in the John Templeton Foundation funded project, The Purposeful Universe.

Wiseman is a Christian and a Fellow of the American Scientific Affiliation and a member of the BioLogos Board of Directors. On June 16, 2010, Wiseman was introduced as the new director for the American Association for the Advancement of Science's (AAAS) program, Dialogue on Science, Ethics, and Religion. She remained in that position until August 2022 when she was succeeded by Katharine Hinman. Her work for AAAS included speaking to organizations about her beliefs on Christianity and Science.

== Awards ==
- Hubble Fellow - 1998
- Jansky Fellow - 1995

== See also ==
- List of women in leadership positions on astronomical instrumentation projects
