= Continuous spontaneous localization model =

Quantum mechanical theory of spontaneous collapse

The continuous spontaneous localization (CSL) model is a spontaneous collapse model in quantum mechanics, proposed in 1989 by Philip Pearle. and finalized in 1990 Gian Carlo Ghirardi, Philip Pearle and Alberto Rimini.

== Introduction ==
The most widely studied among the dynamical reduction (also known as collapse) models is the CSL model. Building on the Ghirardi-Rimini-Weber model, the CSL model describes the collapse of the wave function as occurring continuously in time, in contrast to the Ghirardi-Rimini-Weber model.

Some of the key features of the model are:

- The localization takes place in position, which is the preferred basis in this model.
- The model does not significantly alter the dynamics of microscopic systems, while it becomes strong for macroscopic objects: the amplification mechanism ensures this scaling.
- It preserves the symmetry properties of identical particles.
- It is characterized by two parameters: $\lambda$ and $r_C$, which are respectively the collapse rate and the correlation length of the model.

== Dynamical equation ==
The CSL dynamical equation for the wave function is stochastic and non-linear:
$$\operatorname{d}\!|\psi_t\rangle=\left[	-\frac i\hbar \hat H\operatorname{d}\! t+\frac{\sqrt{\lambda}}{m_0}\int \operatorname{d}\! {\bf x}\,\hat N_t({\bf x})\operatorname{d}\! W_t({\bf x})\right.
\left.-\frac\lambda{2m_0^2}\int\operatorname{d}\!{\bf x}\int\operatorname{d}\!{\bf y}\,g({\bf x}-{\bf y})\hat N_t({\bf x})\hat N_t({\bf y})\operatorname{d}\! t	\right]|\psi_t\rangle.$$
Here $\hat H$ is the Hamiltonian describing the quantum mechanical dynamics, $m_0$ is a reference mass taken equal to that of a nucleon, $g({\bf x}-{\bf y})=e^{-{({\bf x}-{\bf y})^2}/{4r_C^2}}$, and the noise field $w_t({\bf x})=\operatorname{d}\! W_t({\bf x})/\operatorname{d}\! t$ has zero average and correlation equal to
$$\mathbb E[w_t({\bf x}) w_s({\bf y})]=g({\bf x}-{\bf y})\delta(t-s),$$
where $\mathbb E [\ \cdot\ ]$ denotes the stochastic average over the noise. Finally, we write
$$\hat N_t({\bf x})=\hat M({\bf x})-\langle\psi_t|\hat M({\bf x})|\psi_t\rangle,$$
where $\hat M({\bf x})$ is the mass density operator, which reads
$$\hat M({\bf x})=\sum_j m_j\sum_s\hat a^\dagger_j({\bf x},s)\hat a_j({\bf x},s),$$
where $\hat a^\dagger_j({\bf y},s)$ and $\hat a_j({\bf y},s)$ are, respectively, the second quantized creation and annihilation operators of a particle of type $j$ with spin $s$ at the point ${\bf y}$ of mass $m_j$. The use of these operators satisfies the conservation of the symmetry properties of identical particles. Moreover, the mass proportionality implements automatically the amplification mechanism. The choice of the form of $\hat M({\bf x})$ ensures the collapse in the position basis.

The action of the CSL model is quantified by the values of the two phenomenological parameters $\lambda$ and $r_C$. Originally, the Ghirardi-Rimini-Weber model proposed $\lambda=10^{-17}\,$s$^{-1}$ at $r_C=10^{-7}\,$m, while later Adler considered larger values: $\lambda=10^{-8\pm2}\,$s$^{-1}$ for $r_C=10^{-7}\,$m, and $\lambda=10^{-6\pm2}\,$s$^{-1}$ for $r_C=10^{-6}\,$m. Eventually, these values have to be bounded by experiments.

From the dynamics of the wave function one can obtain the corresponding master equation for the statistical operator $\hat \rho_t$:
$$\frac{\operatorname{d}\! \hat\rho_t}{\operatorname{d}\! t}
=-\frac{i}{\hbar}\left[{\hat H},{\hat \rho_t}\right]
-\frac{\lambda}{2m_0^2}\int\operatorname{d}\!{\bf x}\int\operatorname{d}\!{\bf y}\,g({\bf x}-{\bf y})
\left[{\hat M({\bf x})},\left[{{\hat M({\bf y})},{\hat \rho_t}}\right]\right].$$
Once the master equation is represented in the position basis, it becomes clear that its direct action is to diagonalize the density matrix in position. For a single point-like particle of mass $m$, it reads
$$\frac{\partial \langle{{\bf x}|\hat \rho_t|{\bf y}}\rangle}{\partial t}=-\frac{i}{\hbar}\langle{{\bf x}|\left[{\hat H},{\hat \rho_t}\right]|{\bf y}}\rangle-\lambda\frac{m^2}{m_0^2}\left(1-e^{-\tfrac{({\bf x}-{\bf y})^2}{4r_C^2}}\right)\langle{{\bf x}|\hat \rho_t|{\bf y}}\rangle,$$
where the off-diagonal terms, which have ${\bf x}\neq{\bf y}$, decay exponentially. Conversely, the diagonal terms, characterized by ${\bf x}={\bf y}$, are preserved. For a composite system, the single-particle collapse rate $\lambda$ should be replaced with that of the composite system
$$\lambda\frac{m^2}{m_0^2}\to\lambda\frac{r_C^3}{\pi^{3/2}m_0^2}\int\operatorname{d}\!{\bf k}|\tilde\mu({\bf k})|^2e^{-k^2r_C^2},$$
where $\tilde \mu(k)$ is the Fourier transform of the mass density of the system.

== Experimental tests ==
Contrary to most other proposed solutions of the measurement problem, collapse models are experimentally testable. Experiments testing the CSL model can be divided in two classes: interferometric and non-interferometric experiments, which respectively probe direct and indirect effects of the collapse mechanism.

=== Interferometric experiments ===
Interferometric experiments can detect the direct action of the collapse, which is to localize the wavefunction in space. They include all experiments where a superposition is generated and, after some time, its interference pattern is probed. The action of CSL is a reduction of the interference contrast, which is quantified by the reduction of the off-diagonal terms of the statistical operator
$$\rho(x,x',t) = \frac{1}{2\pi\hbar} \int_{-\infty}^{+ \infty} \operatorname{d}\! k \int_{-\infty}^{+ \infty} \operatorname{d}\! w\, e^{-ikw/\hbar} F_{{ CSL}}(k, x-x',t) \rho^{{ QM}}(x+w, x'+w, t),$$
where $\rho^{{QM}}$ denotes the statistical operator described by quantum mechanics, and we define
$$F_{{ CSL}}(k,q,t)= \exp\bigg[-\lambda \frac{m^2}{m_0^2} t \left(1-\frac{1}{t}\int_0^t \operatorname{d}\!\tau \,e^{-{(q-\frac{k\tau}{m})^2}/{4r_C^2}} \right) \bigg].$$
Experiments testing such a reduction of the interference contrast are carried out with cold-atoms, molecules, entangled diamonds and mechanical oscillators.

Similarly, one can also quantify the minimum collapse strength to solve the measurement problem at the macroscopic level. Specifically, an estimate can be obtained by requiring that a superposition of a single-layered graphene disk of radius $\simeq 10^{-5}$m collapses in less than $\simeq 10^{-2}$s.

=== Non-interferometric experiments ===
Non-interferometric experiments consist in CSL tests, which are not based on the preparation of a superposition. They exploit an indirect effect of the collapse, which consists in a Brownian motion induced by the interaction with the collapse noise. The effect of this noise amounts to an effective stochastic force acting on the system, and several experiments can be designed to quantify such a force. They include:

- Radiation emission from charged particles. If a particle is electrically charged, the action of the coupling with the collapse noise will induce the emission of radiation. This result is in net contrast with the predictions of quantum mechanics, where no radiation is expected from a free particle. The predicted CSL-induced emission rate at frequency $\omega$ for a particle of charge $Q$ is given by:

$$\frac{\operatorname{d}\! \Gamma(\omega)}{\operatorname{d}\! \omega}=\frac{\hbar Q^2\lambda}{2\pi^2\epsilon_0c^3m_0^2r_C^2\omega},$$
where $\epsilon_0$ is the vacuum dielectric constant and $c$ is the light speed. This prediction of CSL can be tested by analyzing the X-ray emission spectrum from a bulk Germanium test mass.

- Heating in bulk materials. A prediction of CSL is the increase of the total energy of a system. For example, the total energy $E$ of a free particle of mass $m$ in three dimensions grows linearly in time according to
  $$E(t)=E(0)+\frac{3m\lambda\hbar^{2}}{4m_{0}^{2}r_C^{2}}t,$$
  where $E(0)$ is the initial energy of the system. This increase is effectively small; for example, the temperature of a hydrogen atom increases by $\simeq 10^{-14}$ K per year considering the values $\lambda=10^{-16}$ s$^{-1}$ and $r_C=10^{-7}$m. Although small, such an energy increase can be tested by monitoring cold atoms. and bulk materials, as Bravais lattices, low temperature experiments, neutron stars and planets.
- Diffusive effects. Another prediction of the CSL model is the increase of the spread in position of center-of-mass of a system. For a free particle, the position spread in one dimension reads
  $$\langle{\hat x^2}\rangle_t=\langle{\hat x^2}\rangle_t^{ (QM)}+\frac{\hbar^2\eta t^3}{3 m^2},$$
  where $\langle{\hat x^2}\rangle_t^{ (QM)}$ is the free quantum mechanical spread and $\eta$ is the CSL diffusion constant, defined as
  $$\eta=\frac{\lambda r_C^3}{2\pi^{3/2}m_0^2}\int\operatorname{d}\!{\bf k}\,e^{-{\bf k}^2r_C^2}k_x^2|\tilde \mu({\bf k})|^2,$$
  where the motion is assumed to occur along the $x$ axis; $\tilde \mu({\bf k})$ is the Fourier transform of the mass density $\mu({\bf r})$. In experiments, such an increase is limited by the dissipation rate $\gamma$. Assuming that the experiment is performed at temperature $T$, a particle of mass $m$, harmonically trapped at frequency $\omega_0$, at equilibrium reaches a spread in position given by
  $$\langle{\hat x^2}\rangle_{ eq}=\frac{k_B T}{m\omega_0^2}+\frac{ \hbar^2 \eta}{2m^2 \omega_0^2 \gamma },$$
  where $k_B$ is the Boltzmann constant. Several experiments can test such a spread. They range from cold atom free expansion, nano-cantilevers cooled to millikelvin temperatures, gravitational wave detectors, levitated optomechanics, torsion pendula.

== Dissipative and colored extensions ==
The CSL model consistently describes the collapse mechanism as a dynamical process. It has, however, two weak points.

- CSL does not conserve the energy of isolated systems. Although this increase is small, it is an unpleasant feature for a phenomenological model. The dissipative extensions of the CSL model gives a remedy. One associates to the collapse noise a finite temperature $T_{ CSL}$ at which the system eventually thermalizes. Thus, as an example, for a free point-like particle of mass $m$ in three dimensions, the energy evolution in Ref. is described by
  $$E(t)=e^{-\beta t}(E(0)-E_{ as})+E_{ as},$$
  where $E_{ as}=\tfrac32 k_B T_{ CSL}$, $\beta=4 \chi \lambda /(1+\chi)^5$ and $\chi=\hbar^2/(8 m_0 k_B T_{ CSL}r_C^2)$. Assuming that the CSL noise has a cosmological origin (which is reasonable due to its supposed universality), a plausible value such a temperature is $T_{ CSL}=1$ K, although only experiments can indicate a definite value. Several interferometric and non-interferometric tests bound the CSL parameter space for different choices of $T_{CSL}$.
- The CSL noise spectrum is white. If one attributes a physical origin to the CSL noise, then its spectrum cannot be white, but colored. In particular, in place of the white noise $w_t({\bf x})$, whose correlation is proportional to a Dirac delta in time, a non-white noise is considered, which is characterized by a non-trivial temporal correlation function $f(t)$. The effect can be quantified by a rescaling of $F_{{ CSL}}(k,q,t)$, which becomes
  $$F_{{cCSL}}(k,q,t)=F_{{ CSL}}(k,q,t) \exp\left[	\frac{\lambda \bar\tau}{2}\left(	e^{-(q-k t/m)^2/4r_C^2}-e^{-q^2/4r_C^2}	\right)	\right],$$
  where $\bar\tau=\int_0^t\operatorname{d}\! s\,f(s)$. As an example, one can consider an exponentially decaying noise, whose time correlation function can be of the form $f(t)=\tfrac12\Omega_{ C}e^{-\Omega_{ C}|t|}$. In such a way, one introduces a frequency cutoff $\Omega_{C}$, whose inverse describes the time scale of the noise correlations. The parameter $\Omega_{ C}$ works now as the third parameter of the colored CSL model together with $\lambda$ and $r_C$. Assuming a cosmological origin of the noise, a reasonable guess is $\Omega_{ C}=10^{12}\,$Hz. As for the dissipative extension, experimental bounds were obtained for different values of $\Omega_{ C}$: they include interferometric and non-interferometric tests.
