= Oukaimden =

Oukaimden ⵓⵇⴰⵢⵎⴷⵏ أوكايمدن Oukaimeden
- Rural commune and town
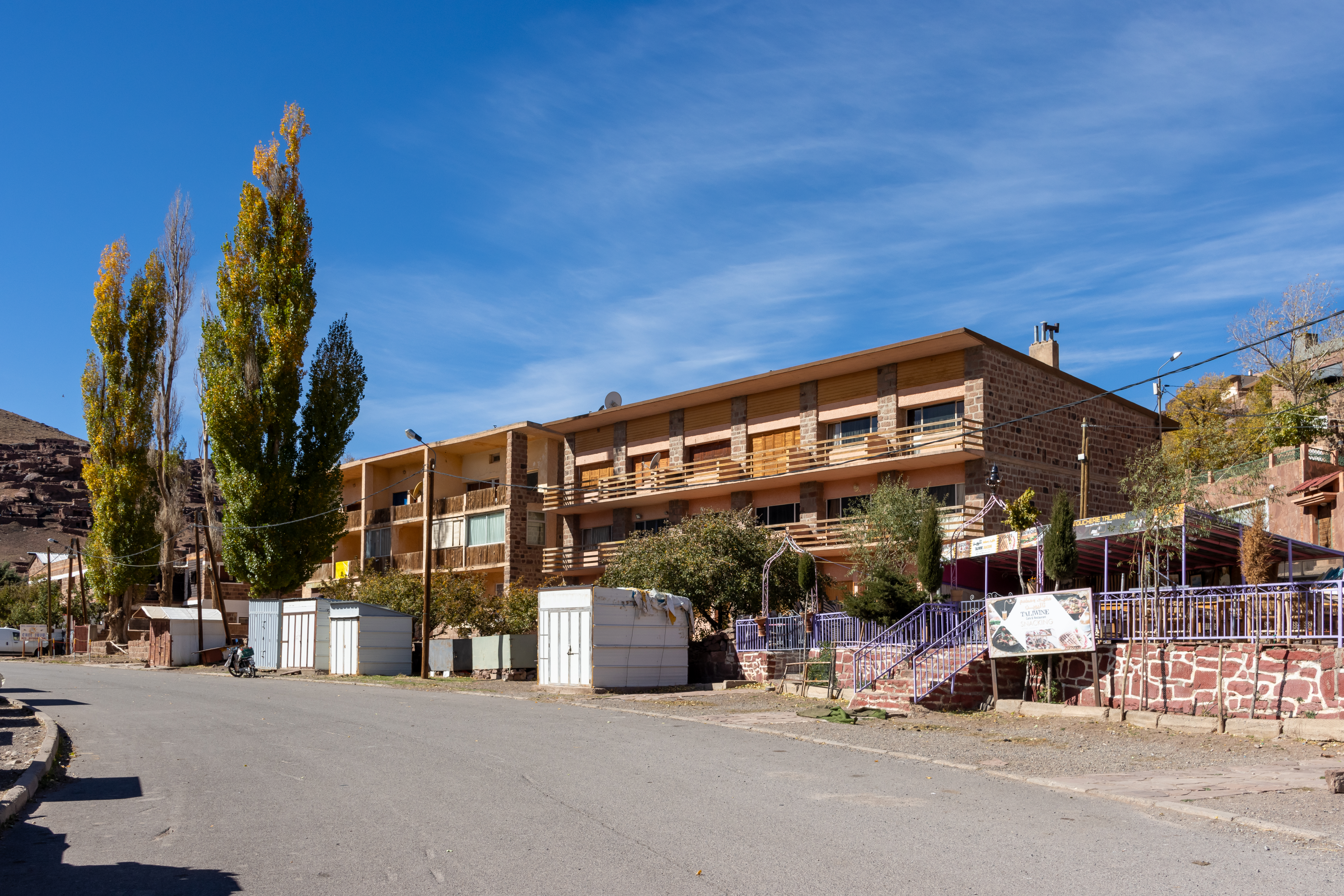
- Interactive map of Oukaimden
- Country: Morocco
- Region: Marrakesh-Safi
- Province: Al Haouz Province

Population (2024)
  - Total: 4,790
- Time zone: UTC+0 (GMT)

Oukaimden or Oukaimeden is a small town and rural commune in Al Haouz Province of the Marrakesh-Safi region of Morocco. At the time of the 2024 census, the commune had a total population of 4,790 people living in 932 households.

The skiing area is at an altitude of between 2,600 metres (8,500 ft) and 3,200 metres (10,500 ft) and has six ski lifts. There are some hotels and ski rental facilities nearby.

== Skiing destination ==
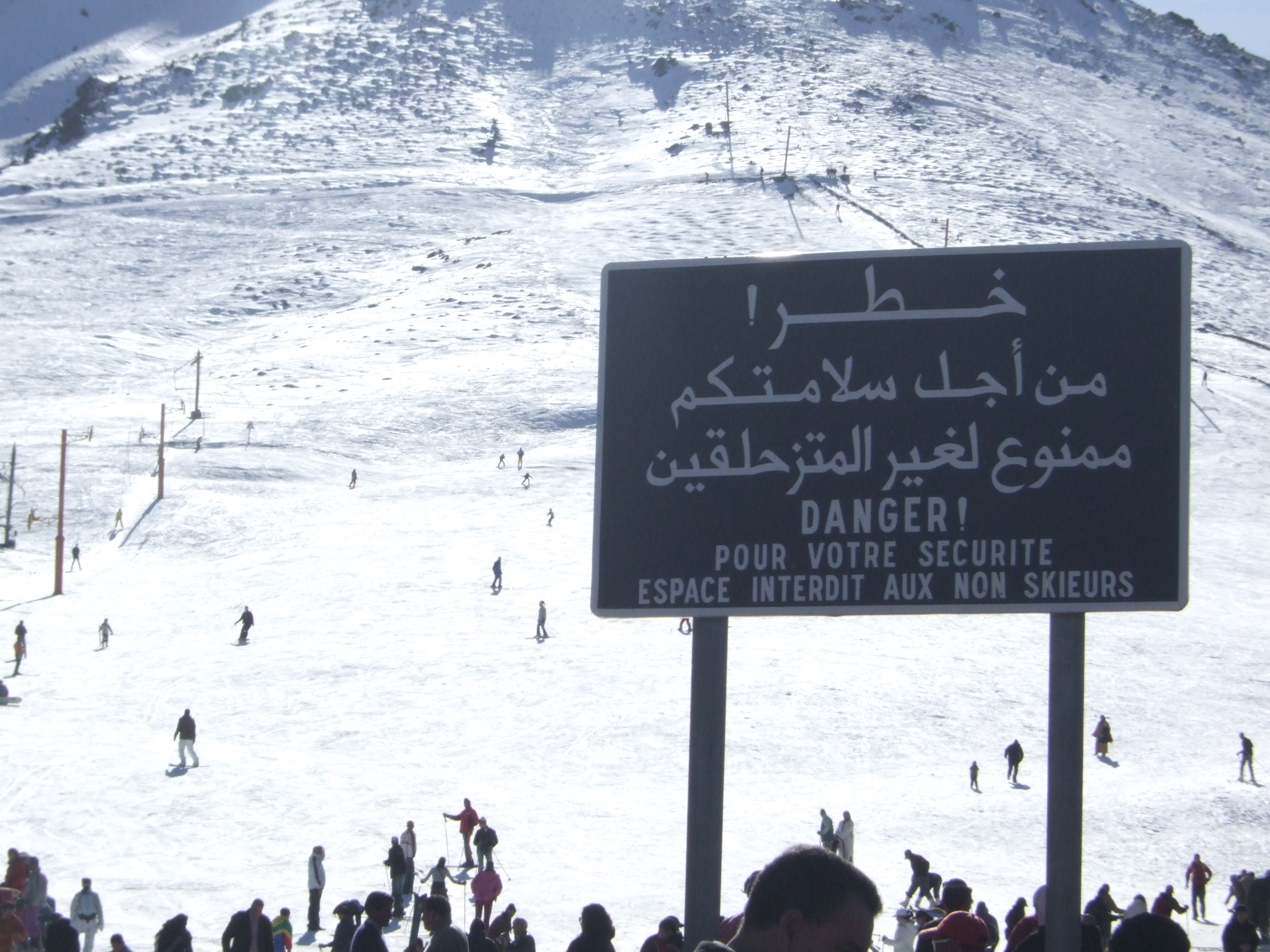
Bouldering sector Oukaimeden

Oukaimden is (along with Michlifen) one of Morocco's principal winter sports destinations. The resort has traditionally relies on seasonal snowfall to attract visitors for skiing and other winter activities. In recent years, the resort faced challenges associated with increasingly unpredictable snowfall and changing tourist preferences. These conditions prompted efforts to diversify its recreational activities and reduce its dependence on the winter skiing season. In April 2026, the Moroccan Agency for Tourism Development (SMIT) launched an international tender worth more than 100 million Moroccan dirhams (~10 million US$) for the redevelopment of the resort, aiming to transform Oukaimden into a year-round mountain tourism destination, catering to families, domestic tourists and international visitors.

== Bouldering destination ==
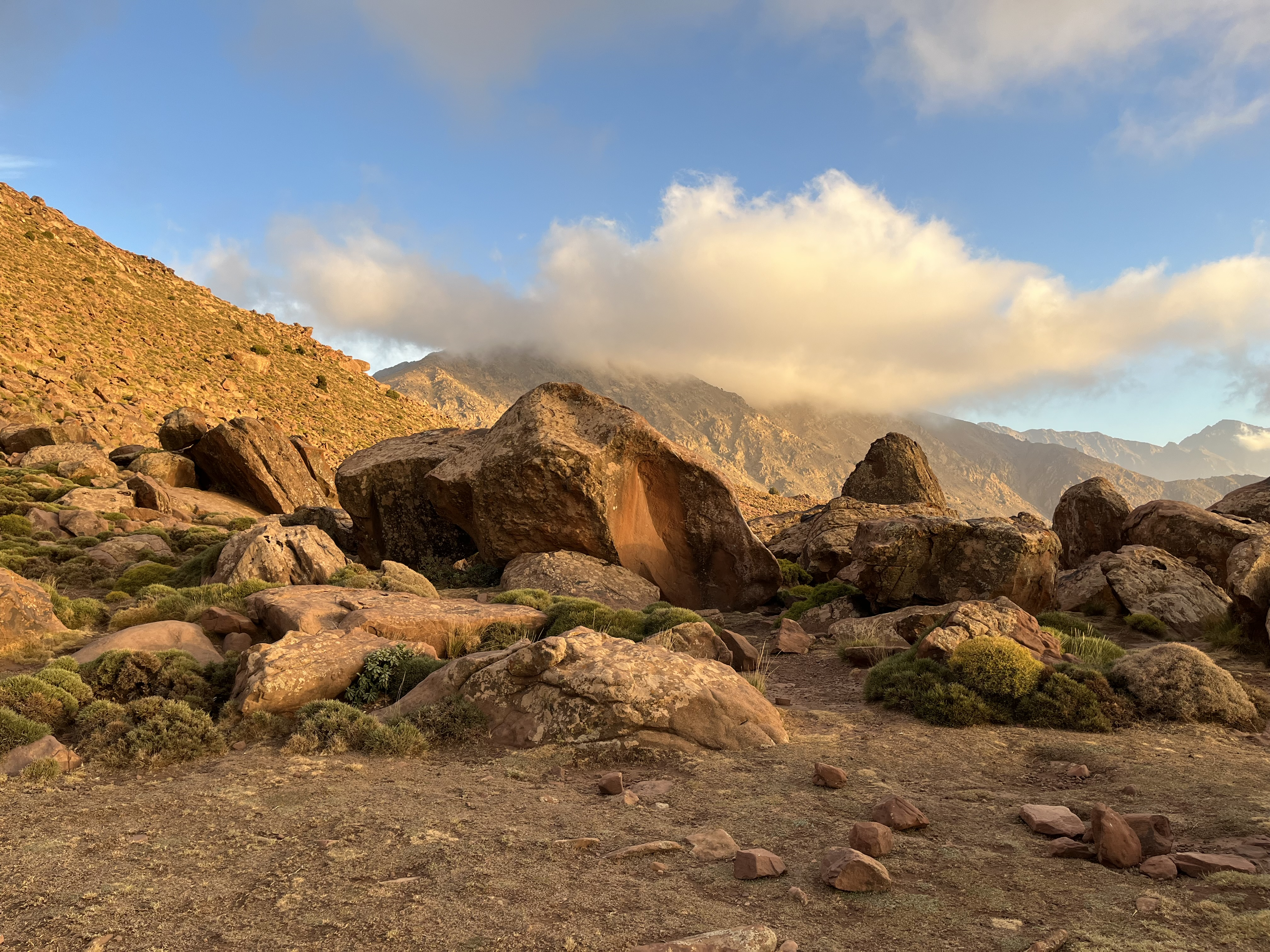
Bouldering sector Oukaimeden

Oukaimden is an international bouldering destination. Oukaimden has been known as a bouldering destination since the 1970s; however it has only attracted international climbers since the early 2010s. In the early years of bouldering in Oukaimden a handful of mainly local climbers from the Club alpin français (CAF) visited the area. It is also the CAF that was responsible for the establishment of some of the first bouldering circuits in the area. The circuits were similar to those used in the well-known and established bouldering area of Fontainebleau in France. Most of these circuits have nevertheless now vanished. On some rocks one can discover a little paint; in some cases the actual number that was painted on is still visible.

In 2013 the Imik'simik association started to document the boulders in the area. Imik'simik published an online guidebook with approximately 1,000 boulders. Because of the vast potential of the area, more first ascents are to be expected. The Imik'simik association has put Oukaïmeden on the map by organising bouldering trips on location.

== Climate ==
Oukaimden has a warm-summer Mediterranean climate (Csb) with short but warm summers and long, chilly winters with a great amount of snowfall.

Climate data for Oukaimden, Morocco (1982–1994)
Month	Jan	Feb	Mar	Apr	May	Jun	Jul	Aug	Sep	Oct	Nov	Dec	Year
Mean daily maximum °C (°F)	5.5 (41.9)	5.9 (42.6)	8.0 (46.4)	9.7 (49.5)	12.7 (54.9)	17.4 (63.3)	22.2 (72.0)	21.9 (71.4)	19.5 (67.1)	12.9 (55.2)	9.0 (48.2)	7.4 (45.3)	12.7 (54.9)
Daily mean °C (°F)	1.0 (33.8)	1.8 (35.2)	3.7 (38.7)	5.2 (41.4)	8.4 (47.1)	12.8 (55.0)	17.6 (63.7)	17.5 (63.5)	15.0 (59.0)	8.7 (47.7)	4.7 (40.5)	3.4 (38.1)	8.3 (46.9)
Mean daily minimum °C (°F)	−3.3 (26.1)	−2.2 (28.0)	−0.2 (31.6)	1.4 (34.5)	4.0 (39.2)	8.2 (46.8)	12.9 (55.2)	13.1 (55.6)	10.3 (50.5)	4.4 (39.9)	0.4 (32.7)	−1.0 (30.2)	4.0 (39.2)
Average precipitation mm (inches)	55.4 (2.18)	78.4 (3.09)	75.8 (2.98)	56.9 (2.24)	47.1 (1.85)	23.0 (0.91)	26.9 (1.06)	18.7 (0.74)	25.7 (1.01)	39.2 (1.54)	50.0 (1.97)	39.2 (1.54)	536.3 (21.11)
Average rainy days	0.0	2.1	2.9	5.3	7.5	5.0	8.5	10.5	6.0	3.1	2.0	1.0	53.9
Average snowy days	9.0	10.0	10.0	3.8	2.0	1.0	0.0	0.0	0.0	1.2	6.0	4.5	47.5
Average relative humidity (%)	56	61	62	61	63	59	51	53	53	61	61	51	58
Source: L'Association Internationale de Climatologie

== See also ==
- Oukaïmeden Observatory
