= Crosshole sonic logging =

Crosshole sonic logging (CSL) is a method to determine the structural integrity of drilled shafts and other concrete piles.

The CSL method is considered to be more accurate than sonic echo testing in the determination of structural soundness of concrete within the drilled shaft inside of the rebar cage. This method provides little indication of concrete soundness outside the cage.

Also known as Crosshole Acoustical Testing, CSL normally requires steel (preferred) or PVC access tubes installed in the drilled shaft and tied to the rebar cage. Before the rebar cage is placed in the hole, the CSL access tubes are attached to the interior of the rebar cage. The cage is then lowered into the hole and the concrete is placed. Steel CSL tubes are preferred over PVC tubes because studies have shown that PVC tubes tend to debond from the concrete due to the heat of hydration process of concrete, resulting in erratic CSL test results.

The tubes are filled with water as an intermediate medium. After curing for 3–7 days, a sound source and receiver are lowered, maintaining a consistent elevation between source and sensor. A signal generator generates a sonic pulse from the emitter which is recorded by the sensor. Relative energy, waveform and differential time are recorded, and logged. This procedure is repeated at regular intervals throughout the pile and then mapped. Areas of signal loss or wave speed reduction greater than 10 percent represent potential physical anomalies and can be targeted for further exploration. Measurements of relative energy or amplitude loss can be indicative of poor curing conditions or concrete heterogeneity including improper mixing of admixtures or retention of concrete laitance within the drilled shaft. By comparing the graphs from the various combinations of access tubes, a qualitative idea of the structural soundness of the concrete throughout the pile can be gleaned.

A more advanced, higher-end analysis that creates a mock 3-dimensional graphical display of the concrete soundness throughout the pile is known as Crosshole Sonic Tomography.

== See also ==
- CSL paper from the 2003 symposium for Nondestructive Testing in Civil Engineering
- CROSSHOLE SONIC LOGGING OF SECANT PILE WALLS
