= CSL Group Ltd =

UK business

CSL Group
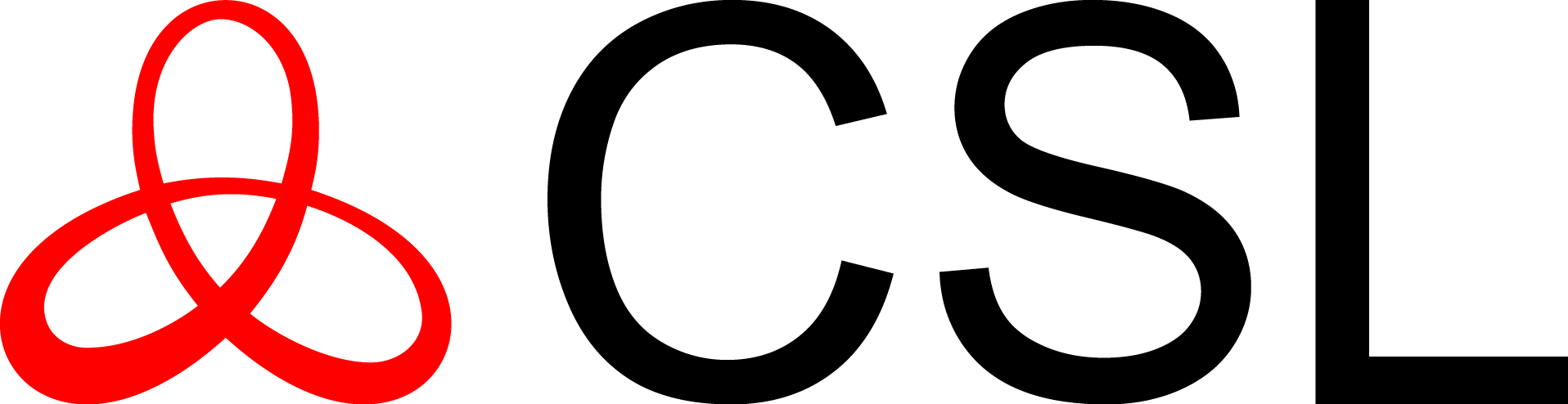
- Type: Private company
- Industry: Telecommunications
- Founded: 1996; 30 years ago
- Headquarters: London, United Kingdom
- Key people: Ed Heale (Chief Executive Officer), Glenn Fishwick (Chief Technical Officer), Jon Slupek (Chief Financial Officer), Catherine Picknell (Chief Marketing Officer), Tony Mann (Chief Operations Officer), Hannah Greehy (HR Director), Jon Shipp (VP IoT)
- Products: Internet of Things, Alarm signalling systems, SIMs, Managed Routers, rSIM®
- Number of employees: 290
- Website: www.csl-group.com

CSL Group is a Critical IoT Connectivity company, providing fully managed single or multi-path solutions to connect any life, mission or business-critical IoT application.

The company designs, delivers, and manages secure, multi-bearer IoT connectivity solutions at scale, integrating devices, networks, and monitoring platforms. Its services include mobile, broadband, and satellite connectivity, along with signal monitoring and analysis tools such as the CSL Signal Analyser and the company’s patented rSIM® technology. CSL’s services are used in regulated and high-dependability sectors including security, telecare, healthcare, utilities, and critical national infrastructure, and are supported by 24/7 managed monitoring and customer service.

== History ==
CSL was founded in 1996 by Simon Banks and Chris Brooks as a UK-based alarm signalling company. From 2005 to 2016, Phil Hollett led operations and oversaw private equity investment from Octopus and later Bowmark Capital. In 2015, Ed Heale joined the company, changing the company strategy and steering its transformation into a global provider of managed IoT connectivity services.

== Ownership and Expansion ==
Since 2006, CSL has been backed by private equity investors, supporting its international expansion and acquisition strategy. The company has made seven strategic acquisitions to date, broadening its product range and geographic footprint.

In October 2025, ECI Partners announced its exit from CSL, reporting a 3.5× return on investment after five years of ownership. According to ECI, CSL achieved annual revenue growth of around 20% during this period and expanded into new verticals including transport, logistics, retail, and utilities.

== Recent Developments ==
In 2023, CSL was selected by Vodafone as a UK National Lottery project partner. In 2024, the company partnered with Vodafone Business to modernise Thames Water’s communications infrastructure ahead of the UK’s Public Switched Telephone Network (PSTN) switch-off in 2027.

As of 2024, CSL managed more than three million active connections worldwide.

== Operations ==
CSL operates from 11 international offices, with its headquarters in northwest London. Additional offices are located in Greater Manchester, Newbury, Ireland, the Netherlands, Sweden, Spain, the United States, and Southeast Asia. Its logistics and warehouse operations are based in Wales.

As of 2024, CSL employed around 250 staff globally.
