= Dynamical reduction =

A dynamical reduction theory (DRT) is an extension of quantum mechanics (QM) that attempts to account for the collapse of the wave function. It is necessary because QM does not account for the specific measurements of observable quantities or events, in the familiar realm of Newtonian or classical physics, that we make in QM experiments.

The reason that QM does not account for measurements is that the time evolution of the quantum state of a system is described probabilistically by linear superpositions of Schrödinger equations. Even if we include the quantum state of the measuring devices, and even if we include the quantum state of the surrounding universe, this gives no information about actual measurements, each of which always appears to choose a particular possible value.

An example of a DRT is Continuous spontaneous localization (CSL).

== See also ==
- Copenhagen interpretation
- Objective-collapse theory
