= (190166) 2005 UP156 =

Near-Earth asteroid

(190166) 2005 UP_{156}
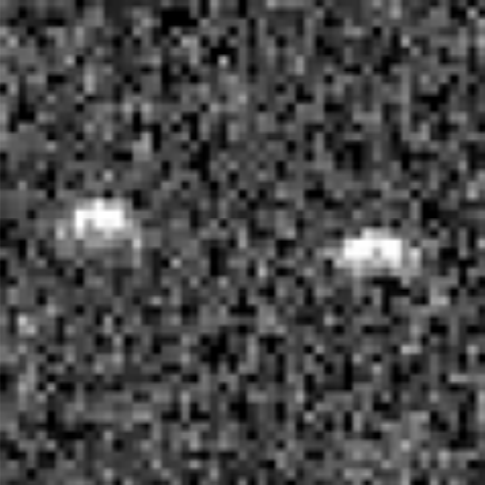
- Radar image of the 2005 UP_{156} binary system taken by the Arecibo Observatory in June 2017

Discovery
- Discovered by: Spacewatch
- Discovery site: Kitt Peak National Obs.
- Discovery date: 31 October 2005

Designations
- Minor planet category: NEO · Amor

Orbital characteristics
- Epoch 4 September 2017 (JD 2458000.5)
- Uncertainty parameter 0
- Observation arc: 14.80 yr (5,405 days)
- Aphelion: 3.1090 AU
- Perihelion: 1.1221 AU
- Semi-major axis: 2.1155 AU
- Eccentricity: 0.4696
- Orbital period (sidereal): 3.08 yr (1,124 days)
- Mean anomaly: 18.539°
- Mean motion: 0° 19^{m} 13.08^{s} / day
- Inclination: 4.2083°
- Longitude of ascending node: 193.41°
- Argument of perihelion: 91.156°
- Known satellites: 1
- Earth MOID: 0.1316 AU (51.3 LD)

Physical characteristics
- Mean diameter: 1.045±0.025 km 1.08 km (calculated)
- Mean density: 1.8 g/cm^{3}
- Synodic rotation period: 40.5±0.1 h (Note: Lightcurve plots from 2014 and 2017 by Brian D. Warner, Palmer Divide Station at the Center for Solar System Studies (CS3). Summary figures at the LCDB); 40.542±0.003 h 40.572±0.003 h (Note: Warner (2017q): publication not yet indexed at ADS. Binary asteroid. Rotation period 40.572±0.003 hours with a brightness amplitude of 1.35±0.05 mag. Quality Code of 3. Summary figures for (190166) at the LCDB); 40.6±0.5 h
- Geometric albedo: 0.20 (assumed); 0.234±0.033
- Spectral type: S
- Absolute magnitude (H): 17.1; 17.2

(190166) 2005 UP_{156} is a stony asteroid and binary system, classified as a near-Earth object of the Apollo group, approximately 1 kilometer in diameter. It was discovered on 31 October 2005, by astronomers of the Spacewatch survey at the Kitt Peak National Observatory in Arizona, United States. Its minor-planet moon with an orbital period of 40.25 hours was discovered in 2017.

== Orbit and classification ==
2005 UP_{156} is an Amor asteroid that approaches the orbit of Earth from beyond but does not cross it. It orbits the Sun at a distance of 1.1–3.1 AU once every 3 years and 1 month (1,124 days). Its orbit has an eccentricity of 0.47 and an inclination of 4° with respect to the ecliptic. The body's observation arc begins with a precovery image taken by NEAT at Palomar Observatory in November 2002, almost four years prior to its official discovery observation. Due to its high eccentricity, the asteroid is also a Mars-crosser, which means that it also crosses the orbit of Mars (at 1.666 AU).

=== Close approaches ===
This near-Earth object has an Earth minimum orbital intersection distance of 0.1316 AU (19,700,000 km) which corresponds to 51.3 lunar distances. On 10 July 2017, it approached Earth to a distance of 0.133 AU and will make its next close approach at 0.128 AU in July 2057.

== Physical characteristics ==
2005 UP_{156} is an assumed S-type asteroid.

=== Rotation period ===
Since 2004, several rotational lightcurves of 2005 UP_{156} were obtained from photometric observations by French amateur astronomers David Romeuf, René Roy, as well as by American astronomer Brian Warner. Analysis of the best-rated lightcurve gave a rotation period of 40.542 hours with a brightness variation of 1.1 magnitude (U=2/3/3/2).

While not being a slow rotator, 2005 UP_{156} has a much longer rotation period than most asteroids, especially for it nearly sub-kilometer size. The lightcurve's high brightness amplitude also indicates that the body has a non-spheroidal shape.

=== Diameter and albedo ===
According to the survey carried out by the NEOWISE mission of NASA's Wide-field Infrared Survey Explorer, 2005 UP_{156} measures 1.045 kilometers in diameter and its surface has an albedo of 0.234, while the Collaborative Asteroid Lightcurve Link assumes a standard albedo for stony asteroids of 0.20 and calculates a diameter of 1.08 kilometers based on an absolute magnitude of 17.2. The asteroid has an estimated density of 1.8 g/cm^{3}.

== Binary system ==
In May 2017, photometric observations by Brian Warner and Alan Harris revealed that 2005 UP_{156} is a synchronous binary system with a secondary component orbiting around the system barycenter every 40.572 hours. The secondary has been confirmed by radar observations.

== Numbering and naming ==
This minor planet was numbered by the Minor Planet Center on 19 August 2008. As of 2018, it has not been named.
