= Levitated optomechanics =

Field of physics relating to optics and quantum mechanics)

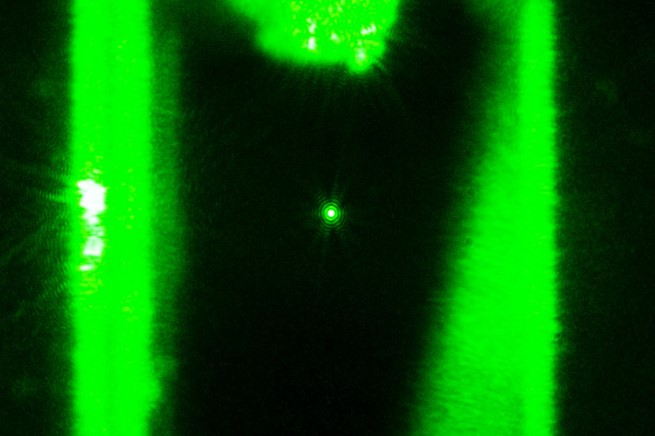
A silica nanoparticle trapped in optical tweezers, illuminated by a green laser beam

Levitated optomechanics is a field of mesoscopic physics which deals with the mechanical motion of mesoscopic particles which are optically or electrically or magnetically levitated. Through the use of levitation, it is possible to decouple the particle's mechanical motion exceptionally well from the environment. This in turn enables the study of high-mass quantum physics, out-of-equilibrium- and nano-thermodynamics and provides the basis for precise sensing applications.

== Motivation ==
In order to use mechanical oscillators in the regime of quantum physics or for sensing applications, low damping of the oscillator's motion and thus high quality factors are desirable. In nano and micromechanics, the Q-factor of a system is often limited by its suspension, which usually demands filigree structures. Nevertheless, the maximally achievable Q-factor usually correlates with the system's size, requiring large systems for achieving high Q-factors.

Particle levitation in external fields can alleviate this constraint. This is one of the reasons why the field of levitated optomechanics has become attractive for research on the foundations in physics and for high-precision applications.

== Physical basics ==
The interaction between a dielectric particle with polarizability $\alpha$ and an electric field $\vec{E}$ is given by the gradient force $\vec{F}_{grad}=-\alpha\vec{\nabla}\vec{E}^2/2$. When a particle is trapped and optically levitated in the focus of a Gaussian laser beam, the force can be approximated to first order by $F_{grad,q}=-k_qq$ with $q\in\{x,y,z\}$, i.e. a harmonic oscillator with frequency $\omega_q=\sqrt{k_q/M}$, where $M$ is the particle's mass. Including passive damping, active external feedback and coupling results in the Langevin equations of motion:

$\ddot{q}(t)=-\underbrace{\Gamma_{CM}\dot{q}(t)}_{\text{damping}}-\underbrace{\omega_q^2q(t)}_{\text{restoring force}}+\underbrace{\frac{\sqrt{2\pi S_{ff}}}{M}}_{\text{coupling}}+\underbrace{u_{fb}(t)}_{\text{feedback}}$

Here $\Gamma_{CM}$ is the total damping rate, which has usually two dominant contributions: collisions with atoms or molecules of the background gas and photon shot noise, which becomes dominant below pressures on the order of 10^{−6} mbar.

The coupling term allows to model any coupling to an external heat bath.

The external feedback is usually used to cool and control the particle motion.

The approximation of a classical harmonic oscillator holds true until one reaches the regime of quantum mechanics, where the quantum harmonic oscillator is the superior approximation and the quantization of the energy levels becomes apparent. The QHO has a ground state of lowest energy where both position and velocity have a minimal variance, determined by the Heisenberg uncertainty principle.

Such quantum states are interesting starting conditions for preparing non-Gaussian quantum states, quantum enhanced sensing, matter-wave interferometry or the realization of entanglement in many-particle systems.

== Methods of cooling ==
=== Parametric feedback cooling and cold damping ===
The idea of feedback cooling is to apply a position and/or velocity dependent force on the particle in a way which produces a negative feedback loop.

One way to achieve that is by adding a feedback term, which is proportional to the particle's position ($u_{fb}(t)\propto\dot{q}(t)$). Since that mechanism provides damping, which cools down the mechanical motion, without the introduction of fluctuations, it is referred to as "cold damping". The first experiment employing this type of cooling was done in 1977 by Arthur Ashkin, who received the 2018 Nobel Prize in Physics for his pioneering work on trapping with optical tweezers.

Instead of applying a linear feedback signal, one can also combine position and velocity via $u_{fb}\propto q(t)\dot{q}(t)$ to get a signal with twice the frequency of the particle's oscillation. This way the stiffness of the trap increases when the particle moves out of the trap and decreases when the particle is moving back.
