= Liège Space Center =

- Centre spatial de Liège
- Abbreviation: CSL
- Founded at: Liège, Belgium
- Type: Research institute
- Location: Liège, Belgium
- Coordinates: 50°35′54″N 5°33′56″E
- Fields: Space technology, astrophysics, optics, stellar astronomy
- Parent organization: University of Liège
- Affiliations: International Astronautical Federation
- Website: http://csl.uliege.be

Liège Space Center (French: Centre spatial de Liège, CSL) is a research center of the University of Liège in Belgium. It holds a hundred people, half of whom are engineers and scientists. The activities of the CSL are specialized in optics, space technologies and space environment testing.

== History ==
Founded in 1959 within the Astrophysics Department of the University of Liège, the CSL originated from the ESA's need for testing and calibration of scientific optical instruments. The CSL is run by the space group of the Institute of Astrophysics of the University of Liège. The space group, formed in the mid-1960s, began its activities by observations of aurora rocket probes. Twenty payloads have been launched, mainly from the base at Kiruna in Sweden.

In 1972, the space group realized the instrument mapping the sky in ultraviolet light from the European satellite TD-1A. This mapping led to catalogs containing new information on more than 30,000 hot stars. CSL studied and realized prototypes of some detectors of the Hubble Space Telescope.

In the early 1980s, CSL participated in the development of the "Halley Multicolour Camera", which embarked aboard the spacecraft Giotto, photographed the nucleus of Halley's Comet in 1986.

Since 1988, CSL has been prime contractor for the instrument "Extreme Ultraviolet Imaging Telescope" launched on the satellite NASA / ESA SOHO in 1995; it photographed the solar corona.

CSL has also contributed actively to these projects:

- XMM / Newton through the development of 'Optical Monitor "
- INTEGRAL by the optics and mechanics of "Optical Monitor Camera"
- IMAGE (NASA's medium explorer) through the implementation of the optomechanical an imaging spectrometer in ultraviolet.

== Activities ==
=== Space instrumentation ===
Active in the field of instrumentation from the 1970s, CSL participates in the development of various instruments, for example most recently:

- PACS, which is currently flying aboard the satellite Herschel ESA;
- a heliospheric imager for NASA's mission SECCHI / STEREO;
- several parts of the French satellite COROT;
- several important elements of the MIRI instrument for the James Webb Space Telescope;
- the whole telescope SWAP for observing the Sun from minisatellite PROBA2.

=== Installation of space tests ===
Parallel to these activities related to the development of scientific instruments, the Space Center of Liege is now one of four testing facilities of the European Space Agency (ESA) and specializes in the performance evaluation of satellite payloads, under observation as well as astrophysics geophysics. Optical vacuum tables, in the halls of high level of cleanliness, can describe the behavior of instruments submitted to a restored space environment. Tests can be performed from temperatures of -270 °C to +120 °C with interferometric stability. The vacuum chambers with optical benches range from 1 m^{3} to 200 m^{3} in volume. Many space experiments have been tested at CSL, up from METEOSAT satellite Planck, through the instruments of Hipparcos and XMM / Newton.

The facilities allow CSL and implement environmental testing in a space environment but also on mechanical testing machine for vibration required to certify the equipment during launches. These vibration tests can be performed in cryogenic conditions, which is required for infrared mission equipment which are cooled before launch (ISO, Herschel).

The CSL has equipment to measure the state of molecular and particulate cleanliness.

=== Technological developments ===
Center of excellence in optics, the CSL has adopted advanced equipment and specialized in various technological activities for terrestrial and space applications. For example:

- surfaces polished by ion beam;
- surface structures with microscopic irregularities controlled by ion beam;
- deposition of thin films and optical coatings;
- microfabrication technology (networks, integrated optics, ...);
- developments in the field of photovoltaics, including the development of concentrators for solar panels for space and terrestrial applications;
- development of sensors for monitoring the integrity (health monitoring).
