= Oukaïmeden Observatory =

Oukaïmden Observatory
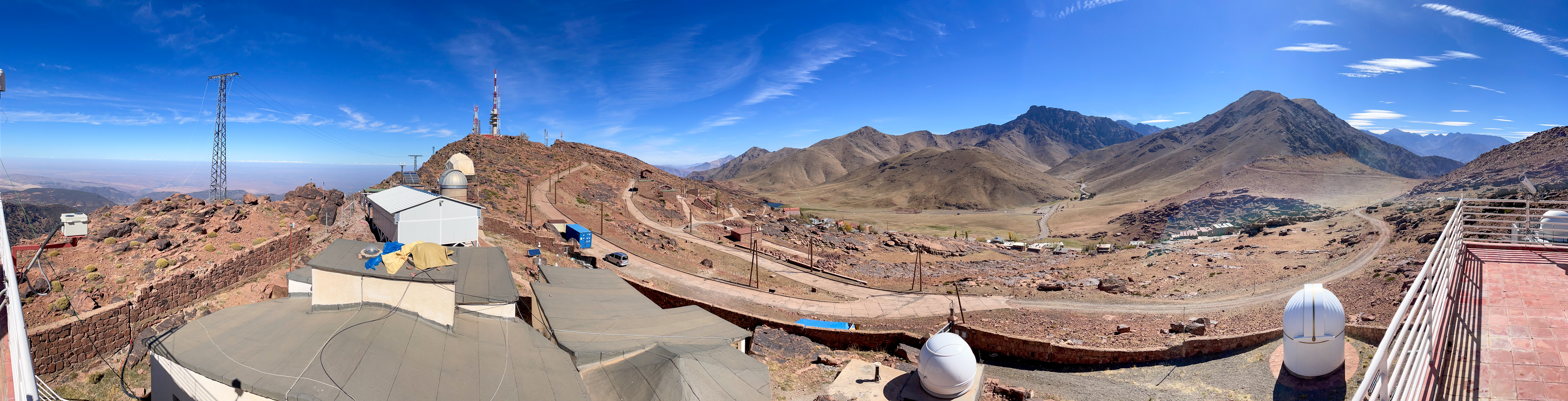
- Organization: European Southern Observatory; Jura Observatory; University of Liège
- Observatory code: J43 (MOSS), Z53 (TRAPPIST-North), Z01 (OWL-Net), Z02 (HAO), Y63 (SNX-NET), Y67 (HAWK)
- Location: Oukaimden, Al Haouz Province, Marrakesh–Safi, Morocco
- Coordinates: 31°12′22″N 7°51′59″W
- Altitude: 2,750 m (9,020 ft)
- Telescopes: TRAPPIST
- Location of Oukaïmeden Observatory
- Related media on Commons

Oukaïmeden Observatory (obs. code: J43) is an astronomical observatory located in the commune of Oukaïmden in the Atlas Mountains of Morocco, where the Morocco Oukaimeden Sky Survey is conducted to observe small Solar System bodies.

== Telescope ==
Located in the Atlas Mountains, 2750 meters above sea level, the TRAPPIST-North telescope is a twin telescope of TRAPPIST-South located at the La Silla Observatory in Chile, both operated from Liège, Belgium, by the Space Center of the University of Liège.

== Discovery ==
In May 2016, data from the telescopes helped identify TRAPPIST-1.

== See also ==
- List of observatory codes § J43
- Rabat Observatory
