= Time's Arrow and Archimedes' Point =

Book about retrocausality and philosophical issues in quantum mechanics

Time's Arrow and Archimedes Point: New Directions for the Physics of Time
- Author: Huw Price
- Language: English
- Subject: Philosophy of physics, arrow of time
- Publisher: Oxford University Press
- Publication date: 1996
- Publication place: United States
- Media type: Print (Hardcover and Paperback)
- Pages: 306
- ISBN: 0-19-510095-6

Time's Arrow and Archimedes Point: New Directions for the Physics of Time is a 1996 book by Huw Price, on the physics and philosophy of the arrow of time. It explores the problem of the direction of time, looking at issues in thermodynamics, cosmology, electromagnetism, and quantum mechanics. Price argues that it is fruitful to think about time from a hypothetical Archimedean point – a viewpoint outside of time. In later chapters, Price argues that retrocausality can resolve many of the philosophical issues facing quantum mechanics and along these lines proposes an interpretation involving what he calls 'advanced action'.

== Summary ==
=== Chapter 1 – The View From Nowhen ===
Price briefly introduces the stock philosophical questions about time, starting with Saint Augustine's observations in Confessions, highlighting the questions 'What is the difference between past and future?', 'Could the future affect the past?' and 'what gives time its direction?'.

He then introduces the block universe view where the 'present' is regarded as a subjective notion, which changes from observer to observer, in the same way that the concept of 'here' changes depending on where the observer is. The block universe view rejects the notion that there exists an objective present and grants that the past, present and future are all equally real. He then surveys reasons to favour this view and common objections to it. Price then introduces the idea of viewing the block universe from an Archimedean point from outside of time, which is the view that is taken in the rest of the book.

Finally, Price introduces two problems regarding the arrow of time, which he calls the taxonomy problem and the genealogy problem. The taxonomy problem is the problem characterizing and finding the relationship between different arrows of time (e.g. the thermodynamic and cosmological arrows of time). The genealogy problem is to explain why asymmetries (i.e. arrows) exist in time, given that the laws of physics seem to be reversible (i.e. symmetric) in time.

=== Chapter 2 – "More apt to be Lost than Got": The Lessons of the Second Law ===
Covers the thermodynamics arrow of time, arising from the second law of thermodynamics. Discusses Ludwig Boltzmann and his development of the second law as a statistical law. The chapter also discusses Boltzmann's H-theorem and Loschmidt's paradox. Price takes a time-symmetric view and comes to the conclusion that the mystery of the second law is not the question of the why entropy increases, but why entropy was low at the beginning of the universe. Taking a time-symmetric view, he then speculates that entropy may decrease again, reaching a minimum at the end of the universe.

=== Chapter 3 – New Light of the Arrow of Radiation ===
This chapter discusses the apparent asymmetry of radiation. Namely, radiation is often observed spreading outwards from a source, but coherent radiation is not observed converging in a sink. Price criticizes explanations of this phenomenon from Karl Popper and Paul Davies and Dieter Zeh. The Wheeler–Feynman absorber theory is discussed and Price concludes that the arrow of time from radiation is a more general case of the thermodynamic arrow of time.

=== Chapter 4 – Arrows and Errors in Contemporary Cosmology ===
In this chapter Price tackles the problem of why entropy was low at the big bang and whether or not we should expect entropy to be low at the other temporal extreme of the universe. He introduces the Gold Universe model, which suggests that the universe will begin and end in a low entropy state. Explanations from Stephen Hawking and Paul Davies of the low entropy big bang are scrutinized. Price concludes that both Hawking and Davies apply a 'temporal double standard' with different standards being applied towards the past and the future. Thus, Price concludes that the arguments are flawed. The Gold Universe view is defended and some of its implications are explored.

=== Chapter 5 – Innocence and Symmetry in Microphysics ===
Price explores what he calls 'The Principle of Independence of Incoming Influences', which is the idea that systems are uncorrelated before they interact, but become correlated after interaction. He distinguishes two versions of this claim. The first is the macroscopic version which Price claims is associated with the low entropy past. The second is the microscopic version, which Price terms μInnocence. Price argues that, while the low entropy past gives us some reason to accept the macroscopic version, there is less reason to accept μInnocence. It is argued that, while μInnocence is intuitively plausible, it arises from a temporal double standard with respect to causality.

=== Chapter 6 – In Search of the Third Arrow ===
This chapter explores the idea of causation. Price argues that ideas about causation exert greater influence on physicists than is generally acknowledged. He explores the argument that the temporal asymmetry of causation comes from physical asymmetry, but ultimately finds this argument unconvincing, especially on the microscopic level. He concludes the chapter by claiming that the most plausible explanation is that the apparent asymmetry of causation is anthropocentric. That is: causation is not asymmetric in time, but we view it as being so because we (human beings) are ourselves thermodynamically asymmetric in time.

=== Chapter 7 – Convention Objectified and the Past Unlocked ===
The chapter introduces the 'conventionalist view' of causation: that the direction of causation is an anthropocentric convention and addresses some common criticisms of the view. The 'bilking argument' against retrocausality is introduced, and Michael Dummett's strategy for avoiding paradoxes in a world with retrocausality is examined.

=== Chapter 8 – Einstein's Issue: The Puzzle of Contemporary Quantum Theory ===
This chapter is a self-contained introduction to quantum mechanics. It introduces the EPR paradox and the measurement problem. Bell's theorem and the GHZ experiment are then introduced in the context of hidden-variables interpretations of quantum mechanics. De Broglie–Bohm theory, the many-worlds interpretation, the many-minds interpretation and the quantum decoherence approach are all examined, though Price finds them all ultimately unconvincing. He points out that Bell's theorem relies on the assumption that, when a measurement basis is chosen, this choice is independent of the state of the quantum system being measured. This, he points out, would not necessarily be the case in a world with advanced action.

=== Chapter 9 – The Case for Advanced Action ===
Price notes that the independence assumption in Bell's theorem can be relaxed in two ways: the first being that the measurement basis and the state of the quantum system are correlated through a common cause in the past, and the second being what Price calls 'advanced action' – a 'common cause' in the future. He argues against superdeterminism, the idea that a quantum system and measurement apparatus are correlated due to a common cause in the past. In contrast, he suggests that the 'advanced action' interpretation is elegant and appealing and fits in better with his 'Archimedean viewpoint'. He briefly discusses the relationship between advanced action and free will.

== Release ==
The book was published by Oxford University Press on 9 October 1997. It was initially released in hardback, but is now available in hardback, paperback and ebook formats.

== Reception ==
Time's Arrow and Archimedes' Point was generally well received. Many reviewers found Price's arguments stimulating and praised his explanations of the issues. However, many took issues with some of his specific arguments.

Joel Lebowitz gave the book a mixed review for Physics Today where he called Price's arguments regarding backward causation "unconvincing", but praised the section on quantum mechanics, writing "his discussion ... of the Bohr-Einstein 'debate' about the completeness of the quantum description of reality is better than much of the physics literature".

Peter Coveney gave the book a mixed review for the New Scientist, criticizing Price's treatment of non-equilibrium statistical mechanics, but concluding by saying "[a]lthough I didn't find many of the arguments convincing, Price's book is a useful addition to the literature on time, particularly as it reveals the influence of modern science on the way a philosopher thinks. But given its restricted and idiosyncratic character, this book should be read only in conjunction with more broadly based works."

John D. Barrow reviewed the book in Nature, strongly criticizing the chapter on the cosmological arrow of time but writing "the author has done physicists a great service in laying out so clearly and critically the nature of the various time-asymmetry problems of physics".

Craig Callender gave the book a detailed, positive review for The British Journal for the Philosophy of Science, calling it "exceptionally readable and entertaining" as well as "a highly original and important contribution to the philosophy and physics of time".

Gordon Belot reviewed the book for The Philosophical Review, writing "[t]his is a fertile and fascinating area, and Price's book provides an exciting entree, even if it does not provide all the answers".

Carlo Rovelli chose the book as one of his favourite books on the subject of time, calling Huw Price "one of the best living philosophers" and saying that it "teaches us an important lesson: we are so used to think time as naturally oriented that we instinctively think that the future is determined by the past even if we try not to"
