= List of philosophers of science =

This is a chronological list of philosophers of science. For an alphabetical name-list, see Category:Philosophers of science.

== Before the 19th century ==
- Roger Bacon
- Sir Francis Bacon
- Galileo Galilei
- David Hume

== 19th century ==
- Auguste Comte
- William Whewell
- George Henry Lewes
- William Stanley Jevons
- Ernst Mach
- Charles Sanders Peirce
- Edmund Husserl
- Frederich Engels

== 1900–1930 ==
- Nikola Tesla
- Henri Poincaré
- Pierre Duhem
- Niels Bohr
- Albert Einstein
- Jacques Maritain
- Bertrand Russell
- Frank P. Ramsey
- Moritz Schlick
- John Dewey
- Alfred North Whitehead

== 1930–1960 ==
- Alfred Ayer
- Mario Bunge
- Hans Reichenbach
- Georges Canguilhem
- Noam Chomsky
- Kenneth Craik
- Alexandre Koyré
- Sir Karl Popper
- Rudolf Carnap
- Michael Polanyi
- Otto Neurath
- Carl Gustav Hempel
- Paul Oppenheim
- Gaston Bachelard
- R. B. Braithwaite
- Werner Heisenberg
- Taketani Mitsuo
- Stephen Toulmin

== 1960–1980 ==
- David Bloor
- David Bohm
- Paul Feyerabend
- Hartry Field
- Mary Hesse
- Thomas Kuhn
- Imre Lakatos
- Ernest Nagel
- Mordechai Nessyahu
- Hilary Putnam
- W.V. Quine
- Michael Ruse
- Carl Friedrich von Weizsäcker

== 1980–present ==
- Peter Achinstein
- David Albert
- Jeffrey A. Barrett
- Roy Bhaskar
- Maarten Boudry
- Richard Boyd
- Arturo Carsetti
- Nancy Cartwright
- David Castle
- Anjan Chakravartty
- Alan Chalmers
- Hasok Chang
- Patricia Churchland
- Paul Churchland
- Daniel Dennett
- John Dupré
- John Earman
- Bas van Fraassen
- Ronald Giere
- Peter Godfrey-Smith
- Rebecca Goldstein
- Adolf Grünbaum
- Susan Haack
- Ian Hacking
- Donna Haraway
- Sandra Harding
- Michał Heller
- Jaakko Hintikka
- Paul Hoyningen-Huene
- Philip Kitcher
- Ursula Klein
- Larry Laudan
- John Lennox
- Isaac Levi
- Peter Lipton
- Helen Longino
- Elisabeth Lloyd
- Tim Maudlin
- Deborah Mayo
- Ernan McMullin
- Peter Medawar
- Sandra Mitchell
- John E. Murdoch
- Nancey Murphy
- Basarab Nicolescu
- Massimo Pigliucci
- John Polkinghorne
- Stathis Psillos
- Hilary Putnam
- Benedict Rattigan
- Alexander Rosenberg
- Oliver Sacks
- Wesley C. Salmon
- Eric Scerri
- Kristin Shrader-Frechette
- Lawrence Sklar
- Brian Skyrms
- Quentin Smith
- Elliott Sober
- Miriam Solomon
- Wolfgang Stegmüller
- Kim Sterelny
- David Stove
- Patrick Suppes
- Claudine Tiercelin
- Roberto Torretti
- John Worrall
