= The Fabric of Reality =

1997 book by David Deutsch

The Fabric of Reality: The Science of Parallel Universes—and Its Implications
- Softcover edition
- Author: David Deutsch
- Language: English
- Subject: Modern physics, quantum mechanics
- Genre: Non-fiction
- Publisher: Viking Adult
- Publication date: August 1, 1997
- Publication place: United States
- Media type: Print (Hardcover, Paperback), Kindle, Audiobook
- Pages: 390 pp.
- ISBN: 978-0713990614
- Followed by: The Beginning of Infinity

The Fabric of Reality is a 1997 book by physicist David Deutsch. His follow-up book, The Beginning of Infinity, was published in 2011.

== Overview ==
The book expands on his views of quantum mechanics and its implications for understanding reality. This interpretation, which he calls the multiverse hypothesis, is one of a four-strand theory of everything (TOE).

=== The four strands ===
1. Hugh Everett's many-worlds interpretation of quantum physics, "The first and most important of the four strands".
2. Karl Popper's epistemology, especially its anti-inductivism and its requiring a realist (non-instrumental) interpretation of scientific theories, and its emphasis on taking seriously those bold conjectures that resist being falsified.
3. Alan Turing's theory of computation, especially as developed in Deutsch's "Turing principle", where Turing's Universal Turing machine is replaced by Deutsch's universal quantum computer. ("The theory of computation is now the quantum theory of computation.")
4. Richard Dawkins' refinement of Darwinian evolutionary theory and the modern evolutionary synthesis, especially the ideas of replicator and meme as they integrate with Popperian problem-solving (the epistemological strand).

=== Deutsch's TOE ===
His theory of everything is (weakly) emergentist rather than reductive. It aims not at the reduction of everything to particle physics, but rather at mutual support among multiverse, computational, epistemological, and evolutionary principles.

== Reception ==
Critical reception has been generally positive. The New York Times wrote a mixed review for The Fabric of Reality, writing that it "is full of refreshingly oblique, provocative insights. But I came away from it with only the mushiest sense of how the strands in Deutsch's tapestry hang together." The Guardian was more favorable in their review, stating "This is a deep and ambitious book and there were plenty of moments when I was out of my depth (the Platonic dialogue between Deutsch and a Crypto-inductivist left me with a pronounced sinking feeling). But the sheer adventure of thinking not just out of the envelope but right out of the Newtonian universe is exhilarating."

== See also ==
- The Beginning of Infinity
- The 4 Percent Universe
- Simulated reality
- Solipsism
