= Quantum suicide and immortality =

Quantum mechanics thought experiment

Quantum suicide is a thought experiment in quantum mechanics and the philosophy of physics. Purportedly, it can falsify any interpretation of quantum mechanics other than the many-worlds interpretation by means of a variation of the Schrödinger's cat thought experiment from the cat's point of view. Quantum immortality refers to the subjective experience of surviving quantum suicide. It is sometimes conjectured to be applicable to real-world causes of death as well.

As a thought experiment, quantum suicide is an intellectual exercise in which an abstract setup is followed through to its logical consequences merely to prove a theoretical point. Virtually all physicists and philosophers of science who have described it, especially in popularized treatments, underscore that it relies on contrived, idealized circumstances that may be impossible or exceedingly difficult to realize, and that its theoretical premises are controversial even among supporters of the many-worlds interpretation. Thus, as cosmologist Anthony Aguirre warns, "it would be foolish (and selfish) in the extreme to let this possibility guide one's actions in any life-and-death question."

== History ==
Hugh Everett III did not mention quantum suicide or quantum immortality in writing; his work was intended as a solution to the paradoxes of quantum mechanics. According to Eugene Shikhovtsev's biography of Everett, "Everett firmly believed that his many-worlds theory guaranteed him immortality: his consciousness, he argued, is bound at each branching to follow whatever path does not lead to death". Peter Byrne, another biographer of Everett, reports that Everett also privately discussed quantum suicide (such as playing high-stakes Russian roulette and surviving in the winning branch), but adds, "It is unlikely, however, that Everett subscribed to this [quantum immortality] view, as the only sure thing it guarantees is that the majority of your copies will die, hardly a rational goal."

Among scientists, the thought experiment was introduced by Euan Squires in 1986. It was published independently by Hans Moravec in 1987 and Bruno Marchal in 1988; it was also described by Huw Price in 1997, who credited it to Dieter Zeh, and independently presented formally by Max Tegmark in 1998. It was discussed by philosophers Peter J. Lewis in 2000 and David Lewis in 2001.

== Thought experiment ==
The quantum suicide thought experiment involves a similar apparatus to Schrödinger's cat—a box that kills the occupant in a given time frame with probability one-half due to quantum measurement. (Note: The simplest example of this is a weapon triggered by a two-level system. Schrödinger described his as a radioactive decay detector, while Moravec's was a device that measured the spin value of protons.) The only difference is that the experimenter recording observations is inside the box. The significance of this thought experiment is that someone whose life or death depends on a qubit could possibly distinguish between interpretations of quantum mechanics. By definition, fixed observers cannot.

At the start of the first iteration, under both interpretations, the probability of surviving the experiment is 50%, as given by the squared norm of the wave function. At the start of the second iteration, assuming a single-world interpretation of quantum mechanics (like the widely held Copenhagen interpretation), the wave function has already collapsed; thus, if the experimenter is already dead, there is a 0% chance of survival for any further iterations. But on the many-worlds interpretation, a superposition of the live experimenter necessarily exists (as does the one who dies). Now, barring the possibility of life after death, after every iteration, only one of the two experimenter superpositions—the live one—can have conscious experience. Putting aside the philosophical problems associated with individual identity and its persistence, under the many-worlds interpretation, the experimenter, or at least a version of them, continues to exist through all of their superpositions where the outcome of the experiment is that they live. In other words, a version of the experimenter survives all iterations of the experiment. Since the superpositions where a version of the experimenter lives occur by quantum necessity (under the many-worlds interpretation), it follows that their survival, after any realizable number of iterations, is physically necessary; hence, the notion of quantum immortality.

A version of the experimenter surviving stands in stark contrast to the implications of the Copenhagen interpretation, according to which, although the survival outcome is possible in every iteration, its probability tends towards zero as the number of iterations increases. According to the many-worlds interpretation, the scenario has the opposite property: the probability of a version of the experimenter living is necessarily one for any number of iterations.

In the book Our Mathematical Universe, Max Tegmark lays out three criteria that, in abstract, a quantum suicide experiment must fulfill:

- The random number generator must be quantum, not deterministic, so that the experimenter enters a state of superposition of being dead and alive.
- The experimenter must be rendered dead (or at least unconscious) on a time scale shorter than that on which they can become aware of the outcome of the quantum measurement. (Note: This is not unanimously agreed upon. Sebens argues, as will be detailed infra, that death must be instantaneous, not merely faster than the brain can process the result of the experiment.)
- The experiment must be virtually certain to kill the experimenter, and not merely injure them.

== Analysis of real-world feasibility ==
In response to questions about "subjective immortality" from normal causes of death, Tegmark suggested that the flaw in that reasoning is that dying is not a binary event as in the thought experiment; it is a progressive process, with a continuum of states of decreasing consciousness. He says that in most real causes of death, one experiences such a gradual loss of self-awareness. It is only within the confines of an abstract scenario that an observer finds they defy all odds. Referring to the above criteria, he elaborates as follows: "Most accidents and common causes of death clearly don't satisfy all three criteria, suggesting you won't feel immortal after all. In particular, regarding criterion 2, under normal circumstances dying isn't a binary thing where you're either alive or dead [...] What makes the quantum suicide work is that it forces an abrupt transition."

=== David Lewis' commentary and subsequent criticism ===
The philosopher David Lewis explored the possibility of quantum immortality in his 2001 lecture "How Many Lives Has Schrödinger's Cat?", his first academic foray into the field of the interpretation of quantum mechanics—and his last, due to his death less than four months later. In the lecture, published posthumously in 2004, Lewis rejected the many-worlds interpretation, allowing that it offers initial theoretical attractions but arguing that it has irremediable flaws, mainly regarding probabilities, and came to tentatively endorse the Ghirardi–Rimini–Weber theory instead. Lewis concluded the lecture by saying that the quantum suicide thought experiment, if applied to real causes of death, entails what he deemed a "terrifying corollary": as all causes of death are ultimately quantum-mechanical in nature, on the many-worlds interpretation, an observer should subjectively "expect with certainty to go on forever surviving whatever dangers [he or she] may encounter", as there will always be possibilities of survival, no matter how unlikely; faced with branching events of survival and death, an observer should not "equally expect to experience life and death", as there is no such thing as experiencing death, and should thus divide his or her expectations only among branches where they survive. But though survival is guaranteed, good health and integrity are not. This leads to a Tithonus-like deterioration of one's body that continues indefinitely, leaving the subject forever just short of death.

Interviewed for the 2004 book Schrödinger's Rabbits, Tegmark rejected this scenario because "the fading of consciousness is a continuous process. Although I cannot experience a world line in which I am altogether absent, I can enter one in which my speed of thought is diminishing, my memories and other faculties fading [...] I am confident that even if he cannot die all at once, he can gently fade away." In the same book, philosopher of science and many-worlds proponent David Wallace attacks the case for real-world quantum immortality on the basis that death can be understood as a continuum of decreasing states of consciousness not only in time, as per Tegmark, but also in space: "our consciousness is not located at one unique point in the brain, but is presumably a kind of emergent or holistic property of a sufficiently large group of neurons [...] our consciousness might not be able to go out like a light, but it can dwindle exponentially until it is, for all practical purposes, gone."

Directly responding to Lewis's lecture, British philosopher and many-worlds proponent David Papineau, while finding Lewis's other objections to the many-worlds interpretation lacking, strongly denies that any modification to the usual probability rules is warranted in death situations. Assured subjective survival can follow from the quantum suicide idea only if an agent reasons in terms of "what will be experienced next" instead of the more obvious "what will happen next, whether will be experienced or not". He writes, "it is by no means obvious why Everettians should modify their intensity rule (Note: By "intensity rule", Lewis and Papineau mean the Born rule, the rule used to apportion probabilities in quantum mechanical events.) in this way. For it seems perfectly open for them to apply the unmodified intensity rule in life-or-death situations, just as elsewhere. If they do this, then they can expect all futures in proportion to their intensities, whether or not those futures contain any of their live successors. For example, even when you know you are about to be the subject in a fifty-fifty Schrödinger’s experiment, you should expect a future branch where you perish, to just the same degree as you expect a future branch where you survive."

On a similar note, quoting Lewis's position that death should not be expected as an experience, philosopher of science Charles Sebens concedes that, in a quantum suicide experiment, "It is tempting to think you should expect survival with certainty." But, he says, expectation of survival could follow only if the quantum branching and death are absolutely simultaneous; otherwise, normal chances of death apply: "If death is indeed immediate on all branches but one, the thought has some plausibility. But if there is any delay it should be rejected. In such a case, there is a short period of time when there are multiple copies of you, each (effectively) causally isolated from the others and able to assign a credence to being the one who will live. Only one will survive. Surely rationality does not compel you to be maximally optimistic in such a scenario." Sebens also explores the possibility that death might not be simultaneous with branching but still faster than a human can mentally realize the experiment's outcome. Again, an agent should expect to die with normal probabilities: "Do the copies need to last long enough to have thoughts to cause trouble? (Note: By "cause trouble," Sebens means spoiling the expectations of necessary subjective survival.) I think not. If you survive, you can consider what credences you should have assigned during the short period after splitting when you coexisted with the other copies."

In the journal Ratio, philosopher István Aranyosi, while noting that the "tension between the idea of states being both actual and probable is taken as the chief weakness of the many-worlds interpretation of quantum mechanics" wrote that most critical commentary on Lewis's immortality argument has revolved around its premises. But even if, for the sake of argument, one entirely accepted Lewis's assumptions, Aranyosi strongly denies that the "terrifying corollary" would follow. Instead, the two most likely scenarios would be what Aranyosi calls the "comforting corollary", in which an observer should never expect to get very sick in the first place, and the "momentary life" picture, in which an observer should expect "eternal life, spent almost entirely in an unconscious state", punctuated by extremely brief, amnesiac moments of consciousness. Thus, Aranyosi concludes that while "[w]e can't assess whether one or the other [of the two alternative scenarios] gets the lion's share of the total intensity associated with branches compatible with self-awareness, [...] we can be sure that they together (i.e. their disjunction) do indeed get the lion's share, which is much reassuring."

=== Analysis by other proponents of the many-worlds interpretation ===
Physicist David Deutsch, a proponent of the many-worlds interpretation, has said of quantum suicide that "that way of applying probabilities does not follow directly from quantum theory, as the usual one does. It requires an additional assumption, namely that when making decisions one should ignore the histories in which the decision-maker is absent....my guess is that the assumption is false."

Tegmark now believes experimenters should only expect a normal probability of survival, not immortality. The experimenter's probability amplitude in the wavefunction decreases significantly, meaning they exist with a much lower measure than they had before. Per the anthropic principle, a person is less likely to find themself in a world where they are less likely to exist, that is, a world with a lower measure has a lower probability of being observed by them. Therefore, the experimenter will have a lower probability of observing the world in which they survive than the earlier world in which they set up the experiment. Lev Vaidman also pointed out this problem of reduced measure in the Stanford Encyclopedia of Philosophy. In his 2001 paper "Probability and the many-worlds interpretation of quantum theory", Vaidman writes that an agent should not agree to undergo a quantum suicide experiment: "The large 'measures' of the worlds with dead successors is a good reason not to play." Vaidman argues that death's instantaneity may seem to imply subjective survival of the experimenter, but that normal probabilities nevertheless apply even in this special case: "Indeed, the instantaneity makes it difficult to establish the probability postulate, but after it has been justified in the wide range of other situations it is natural to apply the postulate for all cases."

In his 2013 book The Emergent Multiverse, Wallace writes that the reasons to expect subjective survival in the thought experiment "do not really withstand close inspection", but concedes that it would be "probably fair to say [...] that precisely because death is philosophically complicated, my objections fall short of being a knock-down refutation". Besides restating that there appears to be no motive to reason in terms of expectations of experience instead of expectations of what will happen, he suggests that a decision-theoretic analysis shows that "an agent who prefers certain life to certain death is rationally compelled to prefer life in high-weight branches and death in low-weight branches to the opposite."

Physicist Sean M. Carroll, another proponent of the many-worlds interpretation, has said of quantum suicide that neither experiences nor rewards should be thought of as shared between future versions of oneself, as distinct persons come into existence when the world splits. He adds that you cannot pick out some future versions of yourself as "really you", and that quantum suicide still cuts off the existence of some of them, which is worth objecting to just as in a single world.

=== Analysis by skeptics of the many-worlds interpretation ===
In his book Cosmological Koans, cosmologist Anthony Aguirre, while personally skeptical of most accounts of the many-worlds interpretation, writes, "Perhaps reality actually is this bizarre, and we really do subjectively 'survive' any form of death that is both instantaneous and binary" But Aguirre notes that most causes of death do not fulfill these two requirements: "If there are degrees of survival, things are quite different." If loss of consciousness were binary as in the thought experiment, the quantum suicide effect would prevent an observer from subjectively falling asleep or undergoing anesthesia, conditions in which mental activities are greatly diminished but not altogether abolished. Consequently, upon most causes of death, even outwardly sudden, if the quantum suicide effect holds true an observer is more likely to progressively slip into an attenuated state of consciousness rather than remain fully awake by some very improbable means. Aguirre adds that quantum suicide as a whole might be characterized as a sort of reductio ad absurdum against both the many-worlds interpretation and theory of mind. He finally hypothesizes that a different understanding of the relationship between the mind and time should remove the bizarre implications of necessary subjective survival.

In his book Beyond Weird, physicist and writer Philip Ball, a critic of the many-worlds interpretation, calls the quantum suicide experiment "cognitively unstable" and exemplary of the difficulties of the many-worlds theory with probabilities. He acknowledges Vaidman's argument that an experimenter should subjectively expect outcomes in proportion of the "measure of existence" of the worlds in which they happen, but ultimately rejects this explanation. "What this boils down to is the interpretation of probabilities in the MWI. If all outcomes occur with 100% probability, where does that leave the probabilistic character of quantum mechanics?" Furthermore, Ball argues that such arguments highlight what he sees as another major problem of the many-worlds interpretation, connected but independent from the issue of probability: the incompatibility with the notion of selfhood. Ball ascribes most attempts of justifying probabilities in the many-worlds interpretation to "saying that quantum probabilities are just what quantum mechanics look like when consciousness is restricted to only one world", but says "there is in fact no meaningful way to explain or justify such a restriction." Before performing a quantum measurement, an "Alice before" experimenter "can't use quantum mechanics to predict what will happen to her in a way that can be articulated—because there is no logical way to talk about 'her' at any moment except the conscious present (which, in a frantically splitting universe, doesn't exist). Because it is logically impossible to connect the perceptions of Alice Before to Alice After [the experiment], "Alice" has disappeared. [...] [The MWI] eliminates any coherent notion of what we can experience, or have experienced, or are experiencing right now."

Philosopher of science Peter J. Lewis, a critic of the many-worlds interpretation, considers the whole thought experiment an example of the difficulty of accommodating probability within the many-worlds framework: "Standard quantum mechanics yields probabilities for various future occurrences, and these probabilities can be fed into an appropriate decision theory. But if every physically possible consequence of the current state of affairs is certain to occur, on what basis should I decide what to do? For example, if I point a gun at my head and pull the trigger, it looks like Everett's theory entails that I am certain to survive—and that I am certain to die. This is at least worrying, and perhaps rationally disabling." In his book Quantum Ontology, Lewis writes that for the subjective immortality argument to be drawn out of the many-worlds theory, one must adopt an understanding of probability—the so-called "branch-counting" approach, in which an observer can meaningfully ask "which post-measurement branch will I end up on?"—that experimental, empirical evidence rules out, as it would yield probabilities that do not match with the well-confirmed Born rule. Lewis identifies instead in the Deutsch-Wallace decision-theoretic analysis the most promising (although still in his judgment incomplete) way to address probabilities on the many-worlds interpretation, in which it is not possible to count branches (or, similarly, the persons that "end up" on each branch). Lewis concludes, "The immortality argument is perhaps best viewed as a dramatic demonstration of the fundamental conflict between branch-counting (or person-counting) intuitions about probability and the decision theoretic approach. The many-worlds theory, to the extent that it is viable, does not entail that you should expect to live forever."

== See also ==
- Quarantine – novel by Australian sci-fi author Greg Egan which explores the Copenhagen interpretation of quantum mechanics, suicide and immortality.
- Multiverse
