= Nessyahu =

Nessyahu (Hebrew: נסיהו) is a Hebrew patronymic surname derived from the given name נסיה. Notable people with the surname include:

- Haim Nessyahu, the namesake of the Nessyahu Prize in mathematics, Israel
- Mordechai Nessyahu (1929–1997), Israeli political theorist and philosopher of science
- Yehudit Nessyahu (1925–2003), Israeli Mossad agent
- Yitzhak Nessyahu (1926–2015), Israeli military commander and politician, former Military Secretary to the Prime Minister
