= David Pegg (disambiguation) =

David Pegg (1935-1958) is the English footballer.

David Pegg may also refer to:

- Dave Pegg (born 1947), musician
- David Pegg (physicist) (born 1941), professor
