= Many-minds interpretation =

Interpretation of quantum mechanics

The many-minds interpretation of quantum mechanics extends the many-worlds interpretation by proposing that the distinction between worlds should be made at the level of the mind of an individual observer. The concept was first introduced in 1970 by H. Dieter Zeh as a variant of the Hugh Everett interpretation in connection with quantum decoherence, and later (in 1981) explicitly called a many or multi-consciousness interpretation. The name many-minds interpretation was first used by David Albert and Barry Loewer in 1988.

== History ==
=== Interpretations of quantum mechanics ===
The various interpretations of quantum mechanics typically involve explaining the mathematical formalism of quantum mechanics, or to create a physical picture of the theory. While the mathematical structure has a strong foundation, there is still much debate about the physical and philosophical interpretation of the theory. These interpretations aim to tackle various concepts such as:

1. Evolution of the state of a quantum system (given by the wavefunction), typically through the use of the Schrödinger equation. This concept is almost universally accepted, and is rarely put to debate.
2. The measurement problem, which relates to what is called wavefunction collapse – the collapse of a quantum state into a definite measurement (i.e. a specific eigenstate of the wavefunction). The debate on whether this collapse actually occurs is a central problem in interpreting quantum mechanics.

The standard solution to the measurement problem is the "Orthodox" or "Copenhagen" interpretation, which claims that the wave function collapses as the result of a measurement by an observer or apparatus external to the quantum system. An alternative interpretation, the Many-worlds Interpretation, was first described by Hugh Everett in 1957 (where it was called the relative state interpretation, the name Many-worlds was coined by Bryce Seligman DeWitt starting in the 1960s and finalized in the 1970s). His formalism of quantum mechanics denied that a measurement requires a wave collapse, instead suggesting that all that is truly necessary of a measurement is that a quantum connection is formed between the particle, the measuring device, and the observer.

=== The many-worlds interpretation ===
In the original relative state formulation, Everett proposed that there is one universal wavefunction that describes the objective reality of the whole universe. He stated that when subsystems interact, the total system becomes a superposition of these subsystems. This includes observers and measurement systems, which become part of one universal state (the wavefunction) that is always described via the Schrödinger Equation (or its relativistic alternative). That is, the states of the subsystems that interacted become "entangled" in such a way that any definition of one must necessarily involve the other. Thus, each subsystem's state can only be described relative to each subsystem with which it interacts (hence the name relative state).

Everett suggested that the universe is actually indeterminate as a whole. For example, consider an observer measuring some particle that starts in an undetermined state, as both spin-up and spin-down, that is – a superposition of both possibilities. When an observer measures that particle's spin, however, it always registers as either up or down. The problem of how to understand this sudden shift from "both up and down" to "either up or down" is called the Measurement problem. According to the many-worlds interpretation, the act of measurement forced a “splitting” of the universe into two states, one spin-up and the other spin-down, and the two branches that extend from those two subsequently independent states. One branch measures up. The other measures down. Looking at the instrument informs the observer which branch he is on, but the system itself is indeterminate at this and, by logical extension, presumably any higher level.

The “worlds” in the many worlds theory is then just the complete measurement history up until and during the measurement in question, where splitting happens. These “worlds” each describe a different state of the universal wave function and cannot communicate. There is no collapse of the wavefunction into one state or another, but rather an observer finds itself in the world leading up to what measurement it has made and is unaware of the other possibilities that are equally real.

=== The many-minds interpretation ===
The many-minds interpretation of quantum theory is many-worlds with the distinction between worlds constructed at the level of the individual observer. Rather than the worlds that branch, it is the observer's mind that branches. The problem with this interpretation is that it implies the observer must be in a superposition with themself, and that seems strange. In their 1988 paper, Albert and Loewer argued that the mind of an observer cannot be in an indefinite state because an observer must answer the question about which state of a system he has observed with complete certainty. If the observer's mind were in a superposition of states, then it could not attain such certainty. To overcome this contradiction, they suggest that a mind must always be in a definite state and only the “bodies” of the minds are in a superposition.

Accordingly, when an observer measures a quantum system and becomes entangled with it, the result is a larger quantum system. In regards to each possibility within this greater wave function, a mental state of the brain corresponds. Ultimately, only one of these mental states is experienced, leading the others to branch off and become inaccessible, albeit real. In this way, every sentient being possesses an infinity of minds, whose prevalence correspond to the amplitude of the wavefunction. As an observer checks a measurement, the probability of realizing a specific measurement directly correlates to the number of minds they have where they see that measurement. It is in this way that the probabilistic nature of quantum measurements are obtained by the Many-minds Interpretation.

== Quantum non-locality in the many-minds interpretation ==
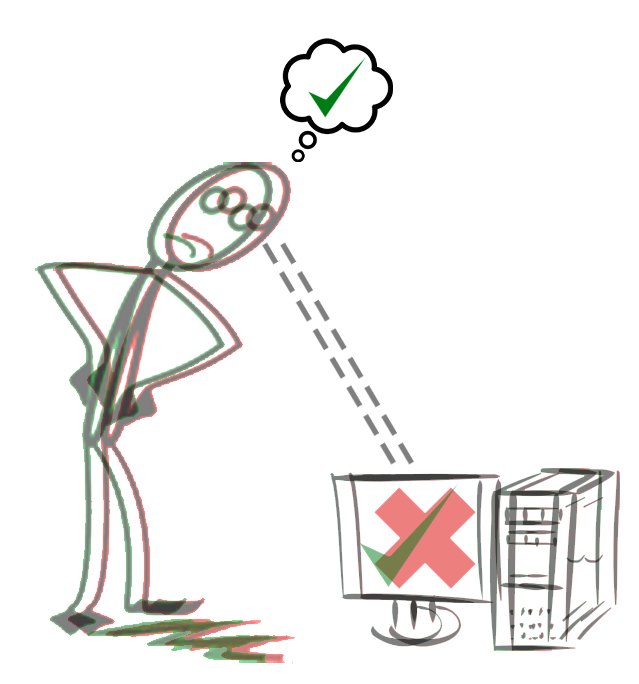
The body remains in an indeterminate state while the minds picks a stochastic result.

Consider an experiment that measures the polarization of two photons. When the photon is created, it has an indeterminate polarization. If a stream of these photons is passed through a polarization filter, 50% of the light is passed through. This corresponds to each photon having a 50% chance of aligning with the filter and thus passing, or being misaligned (by 90 degrees relative to the polarization filter) and being absorbed. Quantum mechanically, this means the photon is in a superposition of states where it is either passed or absorbed. Now, consider the inclusion of another photon and polarization detector. Now, the photons are created in such a way that they are entangled. That is, when one photon takes on a polarization state, the other photon will always behave as if it has the same polarization. For simplicity, take the second filter to either be perfectly aligned with the first, or to be perfectly misaligned (90 degree difference in angle, such that it is absorbed). If the detectors are aligned, both photons are passed (i.e. they are said to agree). If they are misaligned, only the first passes and the second is absorbed (now they disagree). Thus, the entanglement causes perfect correlations between the two measurements – regardless of separation distance, making the interaction non-local. This sort of experiment is further explained in Tim Maudlin's Quantum Non-Locality and Relativity, and can be related to Bell test experiments. Now, consider the analysis of this experiment from the many minds point of view:

=== No sentient observer ===
Consider the case where there is no sentient observer, i.e. no mind present to observe the experiment. In this case, the detector will be in an indefinite state. The photon is both passed and absorbed, and will remain in this state. The correlations are withheld in that none of the possible "minds", or wave function states, correspond to non correlated results.

=== One sentient observer ===
Now expand the situation to have one sentient being observing the device. Now, they too enter the indefinite state. Their eyes, body, and brain are seeing both spins at the same time. The mind however, stochastically chooses one of the directions, and that is what the mind sees. When this observer views the second detector, their body will see both results. Their mind will choose the result that agrees with the first detector, and the observer will see the expected results. However, the observer's mind seeing one result does not directly affect the distant state – there is just no wave function in which the expected correlations do not exist. The true correlation only happens when they actually view the second detector.

=== Two sentient observers ===
When two people look at two different detectors that scan entangled particles, both observers will enter an indefinite state, as with one observer. These results need not agree – the second observer's mind does not have to have results that correlate with the first's. When one observer tells the results to the second observer, their two minds cannot communicate and thus will only interact with the other's body, which is still indefinite. When the second observer responds, his body will respond with whatever result agrees with the first observer's mind. This means that both observer's minds will be in a state of the wavefunction that always get the expected results, but individually their results could be different.

=== Non-locality of the many-minds interpretation ===
As we have thus seen, any correlations seen in the wavefunction of each observer's minds are only concrete after interaction between the different polarizers. The correlations on the level of individual minds correspond to the appearance of quantum non-locality (or equivalently, violation of Bell's inequality). So the many world is non-local, or it cannot explain EPR-GHZ correlations.

== Support ==
There is currently no empirical evidence for the many-minds interpretation. However, there are theories that do not discredit the many-minds interpretation. In light of Bell's analysis of the consequences of quantum non-locality, empirical evidence is needed to avoid inventing novel fundamental concepts (hidden variables). Two different solutions of the measurement problem then appear conceivable: consciousness causes collapse or Everett's relative state interpretation. In both cases a (suitably modified) psycho-physical parallelism can be re-established.

If neural processes can be described and analyzed then some experiments could potentially be created to test whether affecting neural processes can have an effect on a quantum system. Speculation about the details of this awareness-local physical system coupling on a purely theoretical basis could occur, however experimentally searching for them through neurological and psychological studies would be ideal.

== Objections ==
Nothing within quantum theory itself requires each possibility within a wave function to complement a mental state. As all physical states (i.e. brain states) are quantum states, their associated mental states should be also. Nonetheless, it is not what one experiences within physical reality. Albert and Loewer argue that the mind must be intrinsically different than the physical reality as described by quantum theory. Thereby, they reject type-identity physicalism in favour of a non-reductive stance. However, Lockwood saves materialism through the notion of supervenience of the mental on the physical.

Nonetheless, the many-minds interpretation does not solve the mindless hulks problem as a problem of supervenience. Mental states do not supervene on brain states as a given brain state is compatible with different configurations of mental states.

Another serious objection is that workers in no collapse interpretations have produced no more than elementary models based on the definite existence of specific measuring devices. They have assumed, for example, that the Hilbert space of the universe splits naturally into a tensor product structure compatible with the measurement under consideration. They have also assumed, even when describing the behaviour of macroscopic objects, that it is appropriate to employ models in which only a few dimensions of Hilbert space are used to describe all the relevant behaviour.

Furthermore, as the many-minds interpretation is corroborated by our experience of physical reality, a notion of many unseen worlds and its compatibility with other physical theories (i.e. the principle of the conservation of mass) is difficult to reconcile. According to Schrödinger's equation, the mass-energy of the combined observed system and measurement apparatus is the same before and after. However, with every measurement process (i.e. splitting), the total mass-energy would seemingly increase.

Peter J. Lewis argues that the many-minds interpretation of quantum mechanics has absurd implications for agents facing life-or-death decisions.

In general, the many-minds theory holds that a conscious being who observes the outcome of a random zero-sum experiment will evolve into two successors in different observer states, each of whom observes one of the possible outcomes. Moreover, the theory advises one to favour choices in such situations in proportion to the probability that they will bring good results to one's various successors. But in a life-or-death case like an observer getting into the box with Schrödinger's cat, the observer will only have one successor, since one of the outcomes will ensure the observers death. So it seems that the many-minds interpretation advises one to get in the box with the cat, since it is certain that one's only successor will emerge unharmed. See also quantum suicide and immortality.

Finally, it supposes that there is some physical distinction between a conscious observer and a non-conscious measuring device, so it seems to require eliminating the strong Church–Turing hypothesis or postulating a physical model for consciousness.

== See also ==
- Consciousness
- Quantum suicide and immortality
- Quantum mind
- Many-worlds interpretation
- Wave function
