= Weyl curvature hypothesis =

Hypothesis in physics

The Weyl curvature hypothesis, which arises in the application of Albert Einstein's general theory of relativity to physical cosmology, was introduced by the British mathematician and theoretical physicist Roger Penrose in an article in 1979 in an attempt to provide explanations for two of the most fundamental issues in physics. On the one hand, one would like to account for a universe which on its largest observational scales appears remarkably spatially homogeneous and isotropic in its physical properties (and so can be described by a simple Friedmann–Lemaître model); on the other hand, there is the deep question on the origin of the second law of thermodynamics.

Penrose suggests that the resolution of both of these problems is rooted in a concept of the entropy content of gravitational fields. Near the initial cosmological singularity (the Big Bang), he proposes, the entropy content of the cosmological gravitational field was extremely low (compared to what it theoretically could have been), and started rising monotonically thereafter. This process manifested itself e.g. in the formation of structure through the clumping of matter to form galaxies and clusters of galaxies. Penrose associates the initial low entropy content of the universe or the past hypothesis with the effective vanishing of the Weyl curvature tensor of the cosmological gravitational field near the Big Bang. From then on, he proposes, its dynamical influence gradually increased, thus being responsible for an overall increase in the amount of entropy in the universe, and so inducing a cosmological arrow of time.

The Weyl curvature represents such gravitational effects as tidal fields and gravitational radiation. Mathematical treatments of Penrose's ideas on the Weyl curvature hypothesis have been given in the context of isotropic initial cosmological singularities e.g. in the articles. Penrose views the Weyl curvature hypothesis as a physically more credible alternative to cosmic inflation (a hypothetical phase of accelerated expansion in the early life of the universe) in order to account for the presently observed almost spatial homogeneity and isotropy of our universe.

== See also ==
- Gravitational singularity
- Unsolved problems in physics
- White hole
