= Entropy as an arrow of time =

Use of the second law of thermodynamics to distinguish past from future

Entropy is one of the few quantities in the physical sciences that requires a particular direction for time, sometimes called an arrow of time. As one goes "forward" in time, the second law of thermodynamics says, the entropy of an isolated system can increase, but not decrease. Thus, entropy measurement is a way of distinguishing the past from the future. In thermodynamic systems that are not isolated, local entropy can decrease over time, accompanied by a compensating entropy increase in the surroundings; examples include objects undergoing cooling, living systems, and the formation of typical crystals. This idea has been first proposed by Ludwig Boltzmann in 1877.

Much like temperature, despite being an abstract concept, everyone has an intuitive sense of the effects of entropy. For example, it is often very easy to tell the difference between a video being played forwards or backwards. A video may depict a wood fire that melts a nearby ice block; played in reverse, it would show a puddle of water turning a cloud of smoke into unburnt wood and freezing itself in the process. Surprisingly, in either case, the vast majority of the laws of physics are not broken by these processes, with the second law of thermodynamics being one of the only exceptions. When a law of physics applies equally when time is reversed, it is said to show T-symmetry; in this case, entropy is what allows one to decide if the video described above is playing forwards or in reverse as intuitively we identify that only when played forwards the entropy of the scene is increasing. Because of the second law of thermodynamics, entropy prevents macroscopic processes showing T-symmetry.

When studying at a microscopic scale, the above judgements cannot be made. Watching a single smoke particle buffeted by air, it would not be clear if a video was playing forwards or in reverse, and, in fact, it would not be possible as the laws which apply show T-symmetry. As it drifts left or right, qualitatively it looks no different; it is only when the gas is studied at a macroscopic scale that the effects of entropy become noticeable (see Loschmidt's paradox). On average it would be expected that the smoke particles around a struck match would drift away from each other, diffusing throughout the available space. It would be an astronomically improbable event for all the particles to cluster together, yet the movement of any one smoke particle cannot be predicted.

By contrast, certain subatomic interactions involving the weak nuclear force violate the conservation of parity, but only very rarely. According to the CPT theorem, this means they should also be time irreversible, and so establish an arrow of time. This, however, is neither linked to the thermodynamic arrow of time, nor has anything to do with the daily experience of time irreversibility.

Unsolved problem in physics
Arrow of time: Why did the universe have such low entropy in the past, resulting in the distinction between past and future and the second law of thermodynamics?
More unsolved problems in physics

== Overview ==
The second law of thermodynamics allows for the entropy to remain the same regardless of the direction of time. If the entropy is constant in either direction of time, there would be no preferred direction. However, the entropy can only be a constant if the system is in the highest possible state of disorder, such as a gas that always was, and always will be, uniformly spread out in its container. The existence of a thermodynamic arrow of time implies that the system is highly ordered in one time direction only, which would by definition be the "past". Thus this law is about the boundary conditions rather than the equations of motion.

The second law of thermodynamics is statistical in nature, and therefore its reliability arises from the huge number of particles present in macroscopic systems. It is not impossible, in principle, for all 6 × 10^{23} atoms in a mole of a gas to spontaneously migrate to one half of a container; it is only fantastically unlikely—so unlikely that no macroscopic violation of the Second Law has ever been observed.

The thermodynamic arrow is often linked to the cosmological arrow of time, because it is ultimately about the boundary conditions of the early universe. According to the Big Bang theory, the Universe was initially very hot with energy distributed uniformly. For a system in which gravity is important, such as the universe, this is a low-entropy state (compared to a high-entropy state of having all matter collapsed into black holes, a state to which the system may eventually evolve). As the Universe grows, its temperature drops, which leaves less energy [per unit volume of space] available to perform work in the future than was available in the past. Additionally, perturbations in the energy density grow (eventually forming galaxies and stars). Thus the Universe itself has a well-defined thermodynamic arrow of time. But this does not address the question of why the initial state of the universe was that of low entropy. If cosmic expansion were to halt and reverse due to gravity, the temperature of the Universe would once again grow hotter, but its entropy would also continue to increase due to the continued growth of perturbations and the eventual black hole formation, until the latter stages of the Big Crunch when entropy would be lower than now.

== An example of apparent irreversibility ==
Consider the situation in which a large container is filled with two separated liquids, for example a dye on one side and water on the other. With no barrier between the two liquids, the random jostling of their molecules will result in them becoming more mixed as time passes. However, if the dye and water are mixed then one does not expect them to separate again when left to themselves. A movie of the mixing would seem realistic when played forwards, but unrealistic when played backwards.

If the large container is observed early on in the mixing process, it might be found only partially mixed. It would be reasonable to conclude that, without outside intervention, the liquid reached this state because it was more ordered in the past, when there was greater separation, and will be more disordered, or mixed, in the future.

Now imagine that the experiment is repeated, this time with only a few molecules, perhaps ten, in a very small container. One can easily imagine that by watching the random jostling of the molecules it might occur—by chance alone—that the molecules became neatly segregated, with all dye molecules on one side and all water molecules on the other. That this can be expected to occur from time to time can be concluded from the fluctuation theorem; thus it is not impossible for the molecules to segregate themselves. However, for a large number of molecules it is so unlikely that one would have to wait, on average, many times longer than the current age of the universe for it to occur. Thus a movie that showed a large number of molecules segregating themselves as described above would appear unrealistic and one would be inclined to say that the movie was being played in reverse. See Boltzmann's second law as a law of disorder.

== Mathematics of the arrow ==
The mathematics behind the arrow of time, entropy, and basis of the second law of thermodynamics derive from the following set-up, as detailed by Carnot (1824), Clapeyron (1832), and Clausius (1854):

Here, as common experience demonstrates, when a hot body T_{1}, such as a furnace, is put into physical contact, such as being connected via a body of fluid (working body), with a cold body T_{2}, such as a stream of cold water, energy will invariably flow from hot to cold in the form of heat Q, and given time the system will reach equilibrium. Entropy, defined as Q/T, was conceived by Rudolf Clausius as a function to measure the molecular irreversibility of this process, i.e. the dissipative work the atoms and molecules do on each other during the transformation.

In this diagram, one can calculate the entropy change ΔS for the passage of the quantity of heat Q from the temperature T_{1}, through the "working body" of fluid (see heat engine), which was typically a body of steam, to the temperature T_{2}. Moreover, one could assume, for the sake of argument, that the working body contains only two molecules of water.

Next, if we make the assignment, as originally done by Clausius:

$$S= \frac {Q}{T}$$

Then the entropy change or "equivalence-value" for this transformation is:

$$\Delta S = S_{\mathit{final}} - S_{\mathit{initial}} \,$$

which equals:

$$\Delta S = \left(\frac {Q}{T_2} - \frac {Q}{T_1}\right)$$

and by factoring out Q, we have the following form, as was derived by Clausius:

$$\Delta S = Q\left(\frac {1}{T_2} - \frac {1}{T_1}\right)$$

Thus, for example, if Q was 50 units, T_{1} was initially 100 degrees, and T_{2} was 1 degree, then the entropy change for this process would be 49.5. Hence, entropy increased for this process, the process took a certain amount of "time", and one can correlate entropy increase with the passage of time. For this system configuration, subsequently, it is an "absolute rule". This rule is based on the fact that all natural processes are irreversible by virtue of the fact that molecules of a system, for example two molecules in a tank, not only do external work (such as to push a piston), but also do internal work on each other, in proportion to the heat used to do work (see: Mechanical equivalent of heat) during the process. Entropy accounts for the fact that internal inter-molecular friction exists.

== Correlations ==
An important difference between the past and the future is that in any system (such as a gas of particles) its initial conditions are usually such that its different parts are uncorrelated, but as the system evolves and its different parts interact with each other, they become correlated. For example, whenever dealing with a gas of particles, it is always assumed that its initial conditions are such that there is no correlation between the states of different particles (i.e. the speeds and locations of the different particles are completely random, up to the need to conform with the macrostate of the system). This is closely related to the second law of thermodynamics: For example, in a finite system interacting with finite heat reservoirs, entropy is equivalent to system-reservoir correlations, and thus both increase together.

Take for example (experiment A) a closed box that is, at the beginning, half-filled with ideal gas. As time passes, the gas obviously expands to fill the whole box, so that the final state is a box full of gas. This is an irreversible process, since if the box is full at the beginning (experiment B), it does not become only half-full later, except for the very unlikely situation where the gas particles have very special locations and speeds. But this is precisely because we always assume that the initial conditions in experiment B are such that the particles have random locations and speeds. This is not correct for the final conditions of the system in experiment A, because the particles have interacted between themselves, so that their locations and speeds have become dependent on each other, i.e. correlated. This can be understood if we look at experiment A backwards in time, which we'll call experiment C: now we begin with a box full of gas, but the particles do not have random locations and speeds; rather, their locations and speeds are so particular, that after some time they all move to one half of the box, which is the final state of the system (this is the initial state of experiment A, because now we're looking at the same experiment backwards!). The interactions between particles now do not create correlations between the particles, but in fact turn them into (at least seemingly) random, "canceling" the pre-existing correlations. The only difference between experiment C (which defies the Second Law of Thermodynamics) and experiment B (which obeys the Second Law of Thermodynamics) is that in the former the particles are uncorrelated at the end, while in the latter the particles are uncorrelated at the beginning.

In fact, if all the microscopic physical processes are reversible (see discussion below), then the Second Law of Thermodynamics can be proven for any isolated system of particles with initial conditions in which the particles states are uncorrelated. To do this, one must acknowledge the difference between the measured entropy of a system—which depends only on its macrostate (its volume, temperature etc.)—and its information entropy, which is the amount of information (number of computer bits) needed to describe the exact microstate of the system. The measured entropy is independent of correlations between particles in the system, because they do not affect its macrostate, but the information entropy does depend on them, because correlations lower the randomness of the system and thus lowers the amount of information needed to describe it. Therefore, in the absence of such correlations the two entropies are identical, but otherwise the information entropy is smaller than the measured entropy, and the difference can be used as a measure of the amount of correlations.

Now, by Liouville's theorem, time-reversal of all microscopic processes implies that the amount of information needed to describe the exact microstate of an isolated system (its information-theoretic joint entropy) is constant in time. This joint entropy is equal to the marginal entropy (entropy assuming no correlations) plus the entropy of correlation (mutual entropy, or its negative mutual information). If we assume no correlations between the particles initially, then this joint entropy is just the marginal entropy, which is just the initial thermodynamic entropy of the system, divided by the Boltzmann constant. However, if these are indeed the initial conditions (and this is a crucial assumption), then such correlations form with time. In other words, there is a decreasing mutual entropy (or increasing mutual information), and for a time that is not too long—the correlations (mutual information) between particles only increase with time. Therefore, the thermodynamic entropy, which is proportional to the marginal entropy, must also increase with time (note that "not too long" in this context is relative to the time needed, in a classical version of the system, for it to pass through all its possible microstates—a time that can be roughly estimated as $\tau e^S$, where $\tau$ is the time between particle collisions and S is the system's entropy. In any practical case this time is huge compared to everything else). Note that the correlation between particles is not a fully objective quantity. One cannot measure the mutual entropy, one can only measure its change, assuming one can measure a microstate. Thermodynamics is restricted to the case where microstates cannot be distinguished, which means that only the marginal entropy, proportional to the thermodynamic entropy, can be measured, and, in a practical sense, always increases.

== Arrow of time in various phenomena ==
Phenomena that occur differently according to their time direction can ultimately be linked to the second law of thermodynamics, for example ice cubes melt in hot coffee rather than assembling themselves out of the coffee and a block sliding on a rough surface slows down rather than speeds up. The idea that we can remember the past and not the future is called the "psychological arrow of time" and it has deep connections with Maxwell's demon and the physics of information; memory is linked to the second law of thermodynamics if one views it as correlation between brain cells (or computer bits) and the outer world: Since such correlations increase with time, memory is linked to past events, rather than to future events.

== Current research ==
Current research focuses mainly on describing the thermodynamic arrow of time mathematically, either in classical or quantum systems, and on understanding its origin from the point of view of cosmological boundary conditions.

=== Dynamical systems ===
Some current research in dynamical systems indicates a possible "explanation" for the arrow of time. There are several ways to describe the time evolution of a dynamical system. In the classical framework, one considers an ordinary differential equation, where the parameter is explicitly time. By the very nature of differential equations, the solutions to such systems are inherently time-reversible. However, many of the interesting cases are either ergodic or mixing, and it is strongly suspected that mixing and ergodicity somehow underlie the fundamental mechanism of the arrow of time. While the strong suspicion may be but a fleeting sense of intuition, it cannot be denied that, when there are multiple parameters, the field of partial differential equations comes into play. In such systems there is the Feynman–Kac formula in play, which assures for specific cases, a one-to-one correspondence between specific linear stochastic differential equation and partial differential equation. Therefore, any partial differential equation system is tantamount to a random system of a single parameter, which is not reversible due to the aforementioned correspondence.

Mixing and ergodic systems do not have exact solutions, and thus proving time irreversibility in a mathematical sense is (as of 2006) impossible. The concept of "exact" solutions is an anthropic one. Does "exact" mean the same as closed form in terms of already know expressions, or does it mean simply a single finite sequence of strokes of a/the writing utensil/human finger? There are myriad of systems known to humanity that are abstract and have recursive definitions but no non-self-referential notation currently exists. As a result of this complexity, it is natural to look elsewhere for different examples and perspectives. Some progress can be made by studying discrete-time models or difference equations. Many discrete-time models, such as the iterated functions considered in popular fractal-drawing programs, are explicitly not time-reversible, as any given point "in the present" may have several different "pasts" associated with it: indeed, the set of all pasts is known as the Julia set. Since such systems have a built-in irreversibility, it is inappropriate to use them to explain why time is not reversible.

There are other systems that are chaotic, and are also explicitly time-reversible: among these is the baker's map, which is also exactly solvable. An interesting avenue of study is to examine solutions to such systems not by iterating the dynamical system over time, but instead, to study the corresponding Frobenius-Perron operator or transfer operator for the system. For some of these systems, it can be explicitly, mathematically shown that the transfer operators are not trace-class. This means that these operators do not have a unique eigenvalue spectrum that is independent of the choice of basis. In the case of the baker's map, it can be shown that several unique and inequivalent diagonalizations or bases exist, each with a different set of eigenvalues. It is this phenomenon that can be offered as an "explanation" for the arrow of time. That is, although the iterated, discrete-time system is explicitly time-symmetric, the transfer operator is not. Furthermore, the transfer operator can be diagonalized in one of two inequivalent ways: one that describes the forward-time evolution of the system, and one that describes the backwards-time evolution.

As of 2006, this type of time-symmetry breaking has been demonstrated for only a very small number of exactly-solvable, discrete-time systems. The transfer operator for more complex systems has not been consistently formulated, and its precise definition is mired in a variety of subtle difficulties. In particular, it has not been shown that it has a broken symmetry for the simplest exactly-solvable continuous-time ergodic systems, such as Hadamard's billiards, or the Anosov flow on the tangent space of PSL(2,R).

=== Quantum mechanics ===
Another distinct approach is through the study of quantum chaos by which attempts are made to quantize systems as classically chaotic, ergodic or mixing. The results obtained are not dissimilar from those that come from the transfer operator method. For example, the quantization of the Boltzmann gas, that is, a gas of hard (elastic) point particles in a rectangular box reveals that the eigenfunctions are space-filling fractals that occupy the entire box, and that the energy eigenvalues are very closely spaced and have an "almost continuous" spectrum (for a finite number of particles in a box, the spectrum must be, of necessity, discrete). If the initial conditions are such that all of the particles are confined to one side of the box, the system very quickly evolves into one where the particles fill the entire box. Even when all of the particles are initially on one side of the box, their wave functions do, in fact, permeate the entire box: they constructively interfere on one side, and destructively interfere on the other. Irreversibility is then argued by noting that it is "nearly impossible" for the wave functions to be "accidentally" arranged in some unlikely state: such arrangements are a set of zero measure. Because the eigenfunctions are fractals, much of the language and machinery of entropy and statistical mechanics can be imported to discuss and argue the quantum case.

=== Cosmology ===
Some processes that involve high energy particles and are governed by the weak force (such as K-meson decay) defy the symmetry between time directions. However, all known physical processes do preserve a more complicated symmetry (CPT symmetry), and are therefore unrelated to the second law of thermodynamics, or to the day-to-day experience of the arrow of time. A notable exception is the wave function collapse in quantum mechanics, an irreversible process which is considered either real (by the Copenhagen interpretation) or apparent only (by the many-worlds interpretation of quantum mechanics). In either case, the wave function collapse always follows quantum decoherence, a process which is understood to be a result of the second law of thermodynamics.

The universe was in a uniform, high density state at its very early stages, shortly after the Big Bang. The hot gas in the early universe was near thermodynamic equilibrium (see Horizon problem); in systems where gravitation plays a major role, this is a state of low entropy, due to the negative heat capacity of such systems (this is in contrary to non-gravitational systems where thermodynamic equilibrium is a state of maximum entropy). Moreover, due to its small volume compared to future epochs, the entropy was even lower as gas expansion increases its entropy. Thus the early universe can be considered to be highly ordered. Note that the uniformity of this early near-equilibrium state has been explained by the theory of cosmic inflation.

According to this theory the universe (or, rather, its accessible part, a radius of 46 billion light years around Earth) evolved from a tiny, totally uniform volume (a portion of a much bigger universe), which expanded greatly; hence it was highly ordered. Fluctuations were then created by quantum processes related to its expansion, in a manner supposed to be such that these fluctuations went through quantum decoherence, so that they became uncorrelated for any practical use. This is supposed to give the desired initial conditions needed for the Second Law of Thermodynamics; different decoherent states ultimately evolved to different specific arrangements of galaxies and stars.

The universe is apparently an open universe, so that its expansion will never terminate, but it is an interesting thought experiment to imagine what would have happened had the universe been closed. In such a case, its expansion would stop at a certain time in the distant future, and then begin to shrink. Moreover, a closed universe is finite. It is unclear what would happen to the second law of thermodynamics in such a case. One could imagine at least two different scenarios, though in fact only the first one is plausible, as the other requires a highly smooth cosmic evolution, contrary to what is observed:

- The broad consensus among the scientific community today is that smooth initial conditions lead to a highly non-smooth final state, and that this is in fact the source of the thermodynamic arrow of time. Gravitational systems tend to gravitationally collapse to compact bodies such as black holes (a phenomenon unrelated to wavefunction collapse), so the universe would end in a Big Crunch that is very different than a Big Bang run in reverse, since the distribution of the matter would be highly non-smooth; as the universe shrinks, such compact bodies merge to larger and larger black holes. It may even be that it is impossible for the universe to have both a smooth beginning and a smooth ending. Note that in this scenario the energy density of the universe in the final stages of its shrinkage is much larger than in the corresponding initial stages of its expansion (there is no destructive interference, unlike in the second scenario described below), and consists of mostly black holes rather than free particles.
- A highly controversial view is that instead, the arrow of time will reverse. The quantum fluctuations—which in the meantime have evolved into galaxies and stars—will be in superposition in such a way that the whole process described above is reversed—i.e., the fluctuations are erased by destructive interference and total uniformity is achieved once again. Thus the universe ends in a Big Crunch, which is similar to its beginning in the Big Bang. Because the two are totally symmetric, and the final state is very highly ordered, entropy must decrease close to the end of the universe, so that the second law of thermodynamics reverses when the universe shrinks. This can be understood as follows: in the very early universe, interactions between fluctuations created entanglement (quantum correlations) between particles spread all over the universe; during the expansion, these particles became so distant that these correlations became negligible (see quantum decoherence). At the time the expansion halts and the universe starts to shrink, such correlated particles arrive once again at contact (after circling around the universe), and the entropy starts to decrease—because highly correlated initial conditions may lead to a decrease in entropy. Another way of putting it, is that as distant particles arrive, more and more order is revealed because these particles are highly correlated with particles that arrived earlier. In this scenario, the cosmological arrow of time is the reason for both the thermodynamic arrow of time and the quantum arrow of time. Both will slowly disappear as the universe will come to a halt, and will later be reversed.

In the first and more consensual scenario, it is the difference between the initial state and the final state of the universe that is responsible for the thermodynamic arrow of time. This is independent of the cosmological arrow of time.

== See also ==
- Arrow of time
- Cosmic inflation
- Entropy
- H-theorem
- History of entropy
- Loschmidt's paradox
- Past hypothesis
