= Past hypothesis =

Law of physics

In cosmology, the past hypothesis is a fundamental law of physics that postulates that the universe started in a low-entropy state, in accordance with the second law of thermodynamics. The second law states that any closed system follows the arrow of time, meaning its entropy never decreases. Applying this idea to the entire universe, the hypothesis argues that the universe must have started from a special event with less entropy than is currently observed, in order to preserve the arrow of time globally.

This idea has been discussed since the development of statistical mechanics, (Note: See Ludwig Boltzmann Vorlesungen über Gastheorie ("Lectures on Gas Theory", 1896)) but the term "past hypothesis" was coined by philosopher David Albert in 2000. Philosophical and theoretical efforts focus on trying to explain the consistency and the origin of the postulate.

The past hypothesis is an exception to the principle of indifference, according to which every possible microstate within a certain macrostate would have an equal probability. The past hypothesis allows only those microstates that are compatible with a much-lower-entropy past, although these states are assigned equal probabilities. If the principle of indifference is applied without taking into account the past hypothesis, a low- or medium-entropy state would have likely evolved both from and toward higher-entropy macrostates, as there are more ways statistically to be high-entropy than low-entropy. The low- or medium-entropy state would have appeared as a "statistical fluctuation" amid a higher-entropy past and a higher-entropy future.

Common theoretical frameworks have been developed in order to explain the origin of the past hypothesis based on inflationary models or the anthropic principle. The Weyl curvature hypothesis, an alternative model by Roger Penrose, argues a link between entropy, the arrow of time and the curvature of spacetime (encoded in the Weyl tensor).

== See also ==
- Loschmidt's paradox
- Entropy as an arrow of time
- Cold Big Bang
