= The Beginning of Infinity =

2011 book by David Deutsch

- Hardcover edition
- Author: David Deutsch
- Language: English
- Subject: Quantum Computation; Philosophy of science Infinity; Memetics; Many-worlds interpretation
- Genre: Physics, Popular Science
- Publisher: Allen Lane, (UK); Viking Press, (US)
- Publication date: 31 March 2011 (UK); 21 July 2011 (US)
- Publication place: United Kingdom
- Media type: Print (Hardcover, Paperback), Kindle, Audiobook, Audio CD
- Pages: 496 pp
- ISBN: 978-0-7139-9274-8
- LC Class: Q175.32.E97 D48 2011
- Preceded by: The Fabric of Reality

The Beginning of Infinity: Explanations that Transform the World is a popular science book by the physicist David Deutsch first published in 2011.

== Synopsis ==
Deutsch views the Enlightenment of the 18th century as near the beginning of an infinite sequence of purposeful knowledge creation. Knowledge here consists of information with good explanatory function that has proven resistant to falsification. Any real process is physically possible to perform provided the knowledge to do so has been acquired. The Enlightenment set up the conditions for knowledge creation which disrupted the static societies that previously existed. These conditions are the valuing of creativity and the free and open debate that exposed ideas to criticism to reveal those good explanatory ideas that naturally resist being falsified due to their having basis in reality. Deutsch points to previous moments in history, such as Renaissance Florence and Plato's Academy in Golden Age Athens, where this process almost got underway before succumbing to their static societies' resistance to change.

The source of intelligence is more complicated than brute computational power, Deutsch conjectures, and he points to the lack of progress in Turing test AI programs in the six decades since the Turing test was first proposed. What matters for knowledge creation, Deutsch says, is creativity. New ideas that provide good explanations for phenomena require outside-the-box thinking as the unknown is not easily predicted from past experience. To test this Deutsch suggests an AI behavioural evolution program for robot locomotion should be fed random numbers to see if knowledge spontaneously arises without inadvertent contamination from a human programmer's creative input. If it did Deutsch would concede that intelligence is not as difficult a problem as he currently thinks it is.

Deutsch sees quantum superpositions and the Schrödinger equation as evidence for a many worlds quantum multiverse, where everything physically possible occurs in an infinite branching of alternate histories. Deutsch argues that a great deal of fiction is close to a fact somewhere in the multiverse. Deutsch extols the usefulness of the concept of fungibility in quantum transactions, the universes and the particles they contain are fungible in their interactions across the multiverse structure. Deutsch explains that interference offers evidence for this multiverse phenomenon where alternate histories affect one another without allowing the passage of information, as they fungibly intertwine again shortly after experiencing alternate events. According to Deutsch, our perspective on any object we detect with our senses is just a single universe slice of a much larger quantum multiverse object.

Deutsch speculates on the process of human-culture development from a genetic basis through to a memetic emergence. This emergence led to the creation of static societies where innovation occurs, but most of the time at a rate too slow for individuals to notice during their lifetimes. It was only at the point where knowledge of how to purposefully create new knowledge through good explanations was acquired that the beginning of infinity took off during the Enlightenment. His explanation for human creativity is that it evolved as a way to faithfully reproduce existing memes, as this would require creative intelligence to produce a refined rule set that would more faithfully reproduce the existing memes that happened to confer benefit (and all the other memes too). From this increased creative ability, the ability to create new memes emerged and humans thus became universal constructors and technological development accelerated.

Deutsch criticizes Jared Diamond's resource luck theories as to why the West came to dominate the other continents outlined in his book Guns, Germs, and Steel. For Deutsch, the sustained creation of knowledge could have arisen anywhere and led to a beginning of infinity; it just happened to arise in Europe first. Deutsch extols the philosophical concept of optimism, where although problems are inevitable, solutions will always exist provided the right knowledge is sought out and acquired.

== Reception ==
David Albert, a philosophy professor at Columbia University, has described the book in a New York Times review as "brilliant and exhilarating" but presenting, instead of a "tight, grand, cumulative system of ideas," a "great, wide, learned, meandering conversation". He also states that Deutsch does not present "a live scientific hypothesis," but a "mood informed by profound and imaginative reflection on the best and most advanced science we have".

Doug Johnstone writes in The Independent that Deutsch's "examination of the multiverse theory of quantum physics is great. But when he tries to apply his ideas to aesthetics, cultural creativity and moral philosophy, he seems on shakier ground and is less commanding as a result".

Peter Forbes, also writing in The Independent, has a more positive take on Deutsch's ideas and mode of thinking.

The Economist's review says The Beginning of Infinity is "equally bold" as Deutsch's previous book The Fabric of Reality, and "its conclusions are just as profound. Mr Deutsch argues that decent explanations inform moral philosophy, political philosophy and even aesthetics. He is provocative and persuasive."

Kirkus Reviews' take is that the book is "A philosophical exploration of progress, surprisingly lucid and thought-provoking".

== See also ==
- The Fabric of Reality
- Age of Enlightenment
- Scientific Revolution
- Karl Popper
- Explanatory power
