= Joan Vaccaro =

Australian physicist

- Born: 1956 (age 69–70)
- Education: Griffith University (BSc, PHD)
- Scientific career
- Fields: Quantum physics; Quantum thermodynamics; Quantum information theory; Physical nature of time; Wave–particle duality
- Workplaces: University of Strathclyde; Humboldt University of Berlin; Open University; University of Hertfordshire; Griffith University
- Thesis: Physical Number-phase Intelligent and Minimum-uncertainty States of Light (1990)
- Doctoral advisor: David Pegg
- Website: joanv.me

Joan Vaccaro is a physicist at Griffith University and a former student of David Pegg. Her work in quantum physics includes quantum phase, nonclassical states of light, coherent laser excitation of atomic gases, cold atomic gases, stochastic Schrödinger equations, quantum information theory, quantum references, wave–particle duality, quantum thermodynamics, and the physical nature of time.

== Works ==
She is well known for her work on quantum asymmetry, having formulated the widely used entropic measure A_{G}(ρ) of the ability of a system to act as a reference and extended quantum resource theory beyond that of quantum entanglement at the same time. She has extended Landauer's erasure principle, a key result connecting information theory and thermodynamics, to the erasure of information using diverse entropy reservoirs for which there may be a zero cost in terms of energy, and demonstrated the extended principle in the design of a quantum dot heat engine. She has established a connection between the violation of time reversal symmetry (T violation) and the nature of time. Her work proposes T violation as the origin of dynamics which has implications for the arrow of time

== Membership ==
She is a member of the Centre for Quantum Dynamics and a Fellow of the Institute of Physics.
