= David Albert =

American academic (born 1954)

David Z. Albert
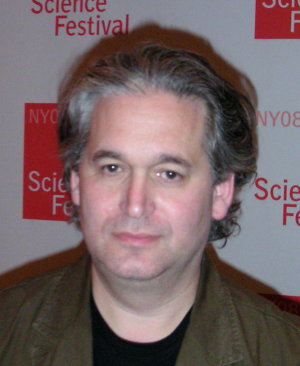
- Albert at the 2008 World Science Festival
- Born: David Z. Albert; 1954 (age 71–72)

Education
- Education: Columbia University; The Rockefeller University
- Thesis: Determination of the critical exponents of the n-vector model by Borel resummation (1981)
- Doctoral advisor: Nicola Khuri

Philosophical work
- School: Analytic philosophy
- Institutions: Columbia University
- Main interests: Philosophy of physics
- Notable ideas: Many-minds interpretation Past hypothesis

David Z. Albert (born 1954) is an American philosopher and physicist specializing in the philosophy of physics. He is a professor of philosophy and the director of the MA Program in philosophical foundations of physics at Columbia University in New York.

== Education and career ==
He received his bachelor's degree in physics from Columbia College (1976) and his PhD in theoretical physics from The Rockefeller University (1981) under Nicola Khuri. Afterwards, he worked with Yakir Aharonov of Tel Aviv University. He has spent most of his career in the philosophy department at Columbia University, although he has also been a frequent visiting professor of philosophy at Rutgers University. In 2015, he was elected a Fellow of the American Academy of Arts & Sciences.

== Philosophical work ==
Albert has published four books—Quantum Mechanics and Experience (1992), Time and Chance (2000), After Physics (2015), and A Guess at the Riddle (2023)—as well as numerous articles on interpretations of quantum mechanics, the direction of time, and other topics. His writing has been both praised and criticized for its informal, conversational style. His first two books are considered influential in the development of the contemporary literature on philosophy of physics.

=== Interpretations of quantum mechanics ===
Albert's first book, Quantum Mechanics and Experience, is regarded to have set a key research agenda in the philosophy of quantum mechanics: that of finding an interpretation of quantum mechanics that is realist in the traditional philosophical sense. This program is in opposition to the Copenhagen interpretation, most popular among working physicists, which had been criticized since its formulation as failing to give an account of observer-independent reality. In Albert's book, he explicates the measurement problem and discusses three interpretations of quantum mechanics which aim to resolve this problem within the context of scientific realism: Ghirardi–Rimini–Weber theory, De Broglie–Bohm theory, and the many-worlds interpretation. This "three-way debate" has framed much of the discourse on foundations of quantum mechanics in the decades since.

In this book and his subsequent work, Albert has argued that the Everett (many-worlds) interpretation is incoherent or incomplete, failing to adequately account for probabilities and the Born rule. He has also argued for wave function realism, the view that the quantum wave function is a concrete physical object, while the "geometrical appearances" of three-dimensional space are produced by the dynamics of the wave function. This contrasts with the "primitive ontology" view (promoted by Valia Allori and others) that objects in space and time are fundamental.

=== Past hypothesis ===
Albert's second book, Time and Chance, develops an approach to the foundations of statistical mechanics which aims to explain the time-asymmetries present in the macroscopic world (such as the asymmetry of causality, the existence of records of the past, and the second law of thermodynamics) in light of the observation that the microscropic dynamical laws are time-symmetric. Albert proposes that the fundamental laws of nature must include not only (1) these dynamical laws, but also (2) a past hypothesis and (3) a statistical postulate. The past hypothesis is a claim that the universe was in a very low-entropy state at some time in the distant past, and the statistical postulate is a probability distribution which specifies that a system in a given thermodynamic macrostate is equally likely to be in each microstate compatible with that macrostate. He argues that these two additional postulates are sufficient to recover all the emergent time-asymmetries, including (for instance) the prediction that ice will melt in a warm room.

While the notion a low-entropy state in the distant past has been discussed since the early days of thermodynamics, Albert is credited with coining the term "past hypothesis" and identifying that classical mechanics cannot be understood as a complete, empirically adequate theory (even in classical contexts—i.e. disregarding relativistic and quantum-mechanical concerns) in the absence of a past hypothesis and statistical postulate.

Subsequent work by Albert and his frequent collaborator Barry Loewer has further developed the account from Time and Chance into a comprehensive theory of the origin of physical probabilities, the relationship between fundamental physics and the special sciences, and a physicalist explanation of counterfactuals and causality. This picture has come to be called the Mentaculus, after a line from the Coen brothers film A Serious Man referring to "the probability map of the universe". Albert has more recently argued that probability is indispensable in scientific explanations, and that standard mechanical predictions such as the orbits of the planets cannot be reliably reproduced in the absence of a statistical postulate.

Albert and Loewer's account has generated much debate, and a collection of essays written in response to Time and Chance and the Mentaculus picture was published in 2023.

== Public philosophy ==
=== Appearance in What the Bleep Do We Know!? ===
Albert appeared in the controversial movie What the Bleep Do We Know!? (2004). According to an article published in Popular Science, he was "outraged at the final product". The article states that Albert granted the filmmakers a near-four hour interview about quantum mechanics being unrelated to consciousness or spirituality. His interview was then edited and incorporated into the film in a way that misrepresented his views. In the article, Albert also expresses his feelings of gullibility after having been "taken" by the filmmakers. Although Albert is listed as a scientist taking part in the sequel to What the Bleep, called "Down the Rabbit Hole", this sequel is a "director's cut", composed of extra footage from the filming of the first movie.

=== Feud with Lawrence Krauss ===
In March 2012, Albert published an extremely negative review of Lawrence Krauss' book A Universe from Nothing: Why There Is Something Rather Than Nothing in The New York Times book review. Krauss claimed that his book counters religion and philosophy, and the book was cited by Richard Dawkins as comparable to Darwin's Origin of Species, on the grounds that it upends the "last trump card of the theologian". In his review, Albert lamented the way in which books like Krauss' forward critiques of religion that are "pale, small, silly, nerdy", and expresses how "the whole business of approaching the struggle with religion as if it were a card game, or a horse race, or some kind of battle of wits, just feels all wrong". Disagreeing with the central thesis of Krauss' book, Albert wrote:

The particular, eternally persisting, elementary physical stuff of the world, according to the standard presentations of relativistic quantum field theories, consists (unsurprisingly) of relativistic quantum fields... they have nothing whatsoever to say on the subject of where those fields came from, or of why the world should have consisted of the particular kinds of fields it does, or of why it should have consisted of fields at all, or of why there should have been a world in the first place. Period. Case closed. End of story.

Krauss reacted vehemently and responded in an interview published in The Atlantic, calling Albert “moronic” and dismissing the philosophy of science as worthless. In March 2013, The New York Times reported that Albert, who had previously been invited to speak at the Isaac Asimov Memorial Debate at the American Museum of Natural History, at which Krauss was also an invited speaker, was later disinvited. Albert claimed: "It sparked a suspicion that Krauss must have demanded that I not be invited. But of course I've got no proof."
