= Barry Loewer =

- Born: Barry Monroe Loewer; 1945 (age 80–81)

Education
- Education: Amherst College (BA, 1965); Stanford University (PhD, 1975)
- Thesis: Knowledge, Names, and Necessity (1975)
- Doctoral advisor: Jaakko Hintikka

Philosophical work
- Era: Contemporary philosophy
- Region: Western philosophy
- School: Analytic philosophy
- Institutions: Rutgers University; University of South Carolina
- Notable students: Jonathan Schaffer
- Main interests: Philosophy of science Philosophy of physics Metaphysics; Philosophy of mind Philosophical logic
- Notable ideas: Many-minds interpretation

Barry Monroe Loewer (born 1945) is an American philosopher who is a distinguished professor of philosophy at Rutgers University and director of the Rutgers Center for Philosophy and the Sciences.

== Education and career ==
He obtained his BA from Amherst College (1965) and his PhD from Stanford University in 1975 (under the direction of Jaakko Hintikka). He taught first at the University of South Carolina before joining Rutgers University in 1989.

== Philosophical work ==
Loewer has published in many areas of philosophy including philosophy of mind, metaphysics, epistemology, history of philosophy, philosophical logic, philosophy of language, and the philosophy of science. He is especially known for work on mental causation, the metaphysics of laws and chance, and the interpretation of quantum mechanics. Loewer has collaborated with Marvin Belzer (on deontic logic), Ernest Lepore (on philosophy of language), and David Albert (on the interpretation of quantum mechanics and the role of chance in statistical mechanics). In his work with Albert he is known for developing the "many-minds interpretation" of quantum theory. The point of this work was not so much to advocate this view as to argue that many worlds interpretations need to be modified to accommodate probabilities. This has become a much discussed and contended issue.
