= Peter J. Lewis =

Philosopher of physics

Education
- Education: University of California, Irvine (PhD); University of California, Irvine (M.A.); Brasenose College, Oxford (B.A.)
- Thesis: The GRW theory and vagueness in quantum mechanics (1996)
- Doctoral advisors: Jeffrey A. Barrett, Karel Lambert, Brian Skyrms

Philosophical work
- Era: Contemporary philosophy
- Region: Western philosophy
- School: Analytic
- Institutions: Dartmouth College; University of Miami
- Main interests: philosophy of quantum physics
- Website: https://sites.google.com/site/peterlewisphilosophy/Home

Peter John Lewis is a professor of philosophy at Dartmouth College.

== Life and works ==
Lewis earned his B.A. in physics from Oxford University in 1988, then continued his studies at the University of California, Irvine, where he completed an M.A. in philosophy in 1992 and a Ph.D. in philosophy in 1996, with a dissertation on The GRW theory and vagueness in quantum mechanics. Before joining Dartmouth College, Lewis was professor of philosophy at the University of Miami from 2001 to 2017.

Lewis's article, "Quantum Mechanics, Orthogonality, and Counting", where he wrote that within Spontaneous Specialization Models "arithmetic does not apply to ordinary macroscopic objects" has been called the start of "the presumed failure of the enumeration principle within the Spontaneous Specialization Models." This "Counting Anomaly" has been discussed and critiqued by other philosophers, some of whom have argued against him while others have upheld this work.

=== Selected publications ===
==== Books ====
- Lewis, Peter J. (2016). Quantum Ontology. doi:10.1093/acprof:oso/9780190469825.001.0001. ISBN 978-0-19-046982-5.
