= H. Dieter Zeh =

German physicist (1932–2018)

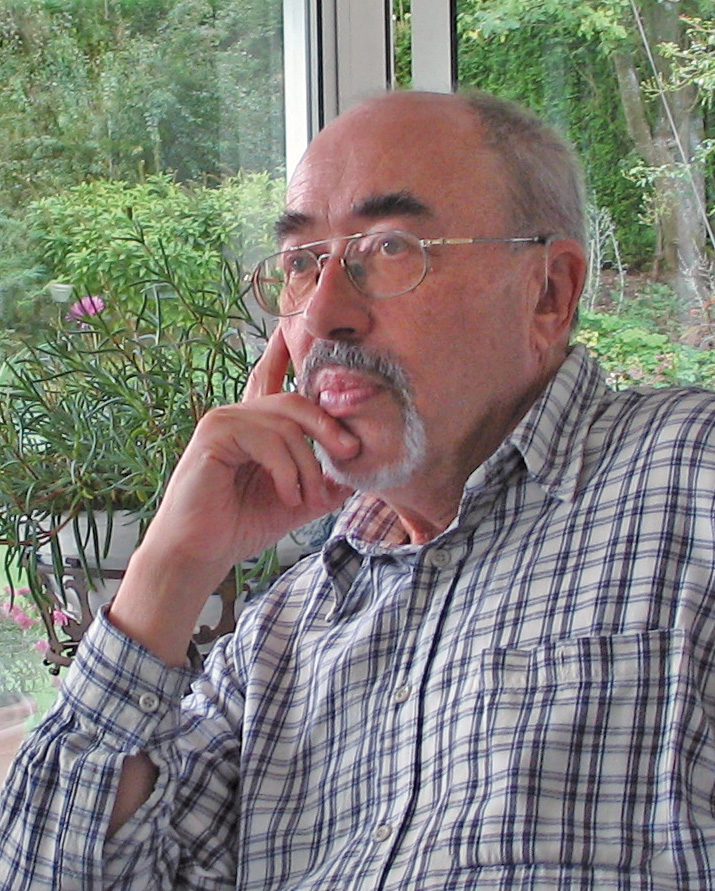
- Born: 8 May 1932; Braunschweig, Free State of Brunswick
- Died: 15 April 2018 (aged 85); Freudenstadt, Baden-Württemberg
- Education: Technical University of Braunschweig; University of Heidelberg
- Known for: Many-minds interpretation Quantum decoherence
- Scientific career
- Fields: Theoretical physics
- Institutions: University of Heidelberg
- Thesis: Untersuchungen zur Theorie des $\alpha$-Zerfalls (1961)
- Doctoral advisor: Hans Jörg Mang

Heinz-Dieter Zeh (German: [tseː]; 8 May 1932 – 15 April 2018) was theoretical physicist and professor emeritus of the University of Heidelberg. He is known for formalizing the theory of quantum decoherence.

== Education and career ==
H. Dieter Zeh was born in Braunschweig and studied physics at the Technical University of Braunschweig and nuclear physics at the University of Heidelberg as a student of J. Hans D. Jensen. At Heidelberg, he also investigated alpha particle formation in nuclei with Hans Jörg Mang and Zeh investigated the topic for his PhD thesis as a student of Mang. Between 1964 and 1965, Zeh was a research assistant at California Institute of Technology and in 1965 and between 1967 and 1968 at the University of California, San Diego. He later became a professor in Heidelberg.

== Research ==
Zeh is known for his work concerning quantum decoherence, described formally in his seminal 1970 paper. He showed that the environment plays a major role in recovering the classical limit from quantum mechanics. In his paper he discussed applications, like explaining the emergence of chirality in sugar molecules. In 1973, with Olaf Kübler, Zeh explained using a reduced density matrix why coherent states are the most classical states, and why quantum superposition can never be observed. Zeh's works provided a solution to the preferred basis problem of quantum mechanics.

The term decoherence was not used until 1989. The first experimental demonstrations of Zeh's work were given about 1996 by Serge Haroche in France and David J. Wineland in United States, who also earned the 2012 Nobel Prize in Physics.

Zeh's 1970 work was also one of the founding papers of the many-minds interpretation of quantum mechanics.

Zeh also dedicated a large part of his work to quantum gravity. In 1986, he argued that gravity assumes classical properties due to environmental degrees of freedom, such as the presence of gravitational waves.

== Bibliography ==
- The Problem Of Conscious Observation In Quantum Mechanical Description (June, 2000).
- The Physical Basis of the Direction of Time, 2001, ISBN 3-540-42081-9
- Decoherence and the Appearance of a Classical World in Quantum Theory, 2003, ISBN 3-540-00390-8 (with Erich Joos, Claus Kiefer, Domenico Giulini, Joachim Kupsch, Ion-Olimpiu Stamatescu)
- "On the interpretation of measurement in quantum theory", 1970, Foundations of Physics, Volume 1, Issue 1, pp. 69–76

== See also ==
- Epistemological Letters
- Measurement problem
- Quantum suicide and immortality
