= David Pegg (physicist) =

Australian physicist (born 1941)

David T Pegg
- Education: University of Queensland
- Known for: Contributions to the nature of time Quantum Optics
- Relatives: Stuart Pegg
- Awards: Harrie Massey Medal (1997)
- Scientific career
- Workplaces: Griffith University
- Doctoral students: J. A. Vaccaro

Professor David Pegg (born 1941) is an emeritus professor in theoretical physics at Griffith University, Australia. In his career, he has made numerous contributions to NMR, quantum optics and conceptual physics including the nature of time. He has published approximately 200 papers and has at least 12300 citations. He is a fellow of the Australian Academy of Science and a Corresponding Fellow of the Royal Society of Edinburgh. He is a recipient of the Harrie Massey Medal for Australian physics and of the Centenary Medal for his contribution to quantum theory. He is best known for the Pegg-Barnett phase formalism that provides a quantum mechanical description of the phase of light, for the invention of the DEPT sequence for nuclear magnetic resonance and for the invention of the quantum scissors device.
