= Jeffrey A. Barrett =

American logician

Jeffrey A. Barrett is Chancellor's Professor in Logic and Philosophy of Science at the University of California, Irvine, where he specializes in philosophy of physics.

== Education and career ==
He earned his Ph.D. in philosophy at Columbia University.

In 2011, he was awarded a Senior Fellowship of the Zukunftskollegs at the University of Konstanz.

In 2022, he was elected a Fellow of the American Academy of Arts & Sciences.

== Philosophical work ==
Barrett is known for his work on the measurement problem of quantum mechanics (why and how quantum systems collapse when one measures them), and particularly on the many-worlds interpretation of Hugh Everett.

His book The Quantum Mechanics of Minds and Worlds (Oxford University Press, 2000) concerns this problem and its solutions, and his book with Peter Byrne, The Everett Interpretation of Quantum Mechanics: Collected Works 1955-1980 with Commentary (Princeton University Press, 2012) collects the works of Everett himself on this problem.
