= Yehudit Nessyahu =

Israeli Mossad agent (1925–2003)

Yehudit Nessyahu, 1992

Yehudit Nessyahu (Hebrew: יהודית נסיהו; 1925–2003) was a Mossad agent. She was one of the first women to hold a senior position in the Mossad.

== Biography ==
Yehudit née Friedman was born in Holland. When she was 3 years old, the family moved to Belgium and immigrated to Palestine in 1940. She joined the Bnei Akiva youth movement and studied philosophy and history at the Hebrew University of Jerusalem, interrupting the studies to join the IDF during the 1948 Arab–Israeli War and continuing the studies after the war. In 1956 she joined ha-Misgeret, an organization, which secretly facilitated the Migration of Moroccan Jews to Israel. After the activities of Misgeret were transferred to Mossad, Yehudit became a member of Mossad.

== Notable operations ==
Yehudit Nessyahu kept a complete secret about her intelligence work, and even never allowed her photographs published while she was alive, and her story was told for the first time by her family after her death.

In 1950s, while in Misgeret, she pretended to be a wealthy Dutch woman, who pretended to be eccentric to hide her being an observant religious Jew.

In 1960 she took part in Adolf Eichmann's capture from Argentina, being the only woman in the team. In Isser Harel's book הבית ברחוב גריבלדי, HaVit baRchov Garibaldi, 'The House on Garibaldi Street' about the operation (made into the film under the same name), she was identified as "Dina Ron".

Later, in 1960, she infiltrated an untraorthodox Satmar community in Antwerp in efforts to locate a boy, Yossele Schumacher, kidnapped by his parents.

== Personal ==
She was born to a family of Haim and Chana as the third child, after Epraim ad Rachel. She was married to Mordechai Nessyahu.
