= Mordechai Nessyahu =

Israeli political theorist

- מרדכי נסיהו
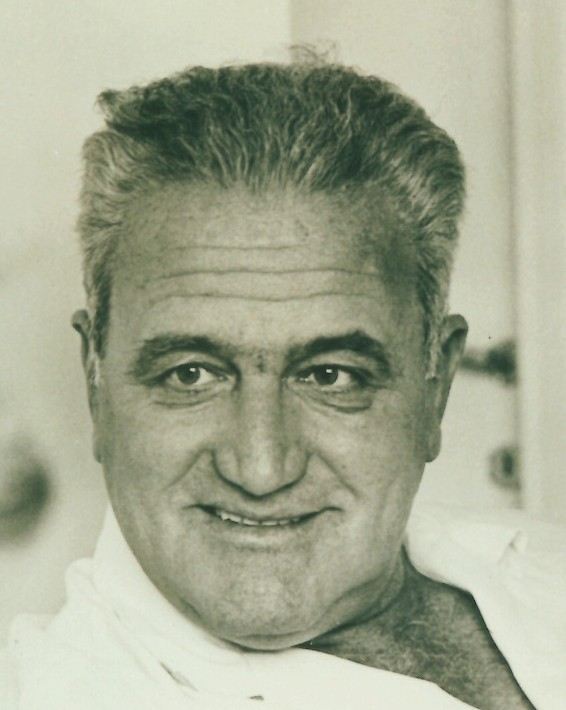
- Mordechai Nessyahu
- Born: September 25, 1929
- Died: April 23, 1997 (aged 67)
- Occupations: Israeli Political Theorist, Philosopher of Science
- Known for: Originator of worldview "Cosmotheism"
- Spouse: Yehudit Nessyahu

Mordechai "Doskhi" Nessyahu (Hebrew: מרדכי נסיהו; September 25, 1929 – April 23, 1997) was an Israeli political theorist and philosopher of science, as well as the originator of a worldview he called cosmotheism.

== Early life and education ==
Nessyahu was born and raised in Haifa to Tzipora (Feiga) and Naftali Zuchman. His mother, the daughter of a rebbe from the Skver dynasty of rebbes and a descendant of Mordechai Twersky, abandoned the Haredi world and became an atheist, and she had a great influence on shaping his path. He studied at the Hebrew Reali School in Haifa. In his youth he was involved in communist activity but abandoned it. He served in the history branch of the IDF, where he where he produced, together with Yehoshua Ben-Arieh and others, the book "History of the War of Independence", the official summary of the War of Independence.

In his youth he was a member of Mapam.

== Author and researcher career ==
While studying physics and philosophy at the Hebrew University, Nessyahu began to formulate the worldview he eventually called cosmotheism, they referred to in some sources as cosmodeism. He exchanged several letters on the subject with Albert Einstein. In 1953 he published a book in Hebrew entitled Cosmic Science and the Scientific Society which became the foundation of his eventual cosmotheistic formulation. Moshe Sharett, soon to be Israel's second prime minister, was so impressed by the book that he shared it with Prime Minister David Ben-Gurion. As a result, Nessyahu was appointed Director of the Research Department of the Israeli Labor Party.

In the 1960s, Nessyahu supported Ben-Gurion in his political struggles within Mapai and was close to the "Ben-Gurion Youth" (including Moshe Dayan and Shimon Peres), but did not leave Mapai with them when Rafi was established. After Dayan and Peres returned to the Labor Party, he joined the "Rafi Brigade" within the Labor Party in 1969. From that period until his retirement, he was head of the research department at Beit Berl.

Nessyahu published five ideological and political books. Moshe Sharett wrote in the introduction about his book "The Scientific Revolution and the Developing World": "An original book... the fruit of in-depth study by an Israeli thinker and researcher, a member of the new generation." Prof. Yehezkel Dror wrote in the introduction about his book "Israel as a Challenge": "The main importance of the book is that it is a pioneering attempt at new thought."

== The cosmotheistic hypothesis ==
Nessyahu's cosmotheistic hypothesis stipulates that the Big Bang that created our cosmos was a local event in an infinite universe — a universe that contains an infinite number of cosmoi (what is now being speculated by theoretical physicists as the multiverse). It proposes that this cosmos is an evolutionary entity, in a constant state of ever growing complexity — that eventually has produced conscious life. It posits that due to the evolutionary nature of cosmic development, now being revealed by the "new physics" and "new cosmology", it is statistically certain that huge numbers of conscious life-forms (equivalent in self-awareness to human beings) have arisen throughout the cosmos; as if conscious life has been sown (as a cosmic genome) throughout the cosmos by the very process of cosmic evolution.

Nessyahu postulated that a number of these conscious life-forms will conclude that they must strive to become part of the God-ing of the cosmos. The expansion of conscious life throughout the cosmos will eventually be unfettered by its physical limitations and ultimately conscious life will fill the entire cosmos; it will become co-eval with a cosmos that has dissolved into pure radiation as an inevitable consequence of entropy. Thus the cosmos will become in its entirety a conscious universal being — i.e., the cosmos will have become God. Cosmotheism posits God as the consequence of the cosmos and not as its cause. Not in the beginning God created the cosmos but in the end the evolutionary cosmos will have created God.

== Personal life ==
In 1962, Nessyahu married Yehudit Nessyahu, one of the first women to hold a senior position in the Mossad. She took part in Adolf Eichmann's capture as "Dina Ron".

== Books ==
(all in Hebrew)

- Mada Ha'Cosmos ve-Hevrat Ha'Mada (Cosmic Science and the Scientific Society); Tel Aviv: Katavim, 1953
- Shtei Drachim Vaderech (Two Roads and the Road); Tel Aviv: Ayanot, 1954
- Darkah shel Mapai (The Way of Mapai); Israel: Beit Berl, 1958
- Ha-Mahapekhah ha-mada'it ṿeha-olam ha-mitpate'aḥ (The Scientific Revolution and the Developing World); Tel Aviv: Am Oved, 1965
- Yiśrael ke-etgar: mi-20 la-medinah li-shenat 2000 (Israel as a challenge: from the State's 20th anniversary to the year 2000). Tel Aviv: Am Oved, 1969
- Peace Time, Facts and Thoughts on the Oslo Track. Israel, 1994
- Ḳosmoteizm (Cosmotheism). Ramat Gan: Poeṭiḳah, 1997
