= Huw Price =

Australian philosopher

Huw Price FBA FAHA
- Born: 17 May 1953 (age 73); Oxford, England

Education
- Education: Australian National University; University of Oxford; Darwin College, Cambridge
- Thesis: The Problem of the Single Case (1981)
- Doctoral advisor: Hugh Mellor

Philosophical work
- Era: Contemporary philosophy
- Region: Western philosophy
- School: Analytic philosophy Neo-pragmatism
- Institutions: Trinity College, Cambridge
- Main interests: Philosophy of science
- Notable ideas: Global expressivism (anti-representationalism), subject naturalism (philosophy as an inquiry grounded in scientific knowledge of human nature)
- Website: prce.hu/w/

Huw Price (/ˈhjuː ˈpraɪs/; born 17 May 1953) is a British-born Australian philosopher, formerly the Bertrand Russell Professor in the Faculty of Philosophy, Cambridge, and a Fellow of Trinity College, Cambridge.

He was previously Challis Professor of Philosophy and Director of the Centre for Time at the University of Sydney, and before that Professor of Logic and Metaphysics at the University of Edinburgh. He is also one of three founders and the Academic Director of the Centre for the Study of Existential Risk at the University of Cambridge, and the Academic Director of the Leverhulme Centre for the Future of Intelligence.

== Work ==
Price is known for his work in philosophy of physics and for his brand of "neo-pragmatism" and "anti-representationalism", according to which "all utterances must be looked at through the lens of their function in our interactions, not the metaphysics of their semantic relations." This view has acknowledged affinities with the work of Robert Brandom and, earlier, Wilfrid Sellars.

He was elected a Fellow of Australian Academy of the Humanities in 1994, and a Fellow of the British Academy in 2012.

=== Machine intelligence ===
Around 2012, Price co-founded the Centre for the Study of Existential Risk, stating that "It seems a reasonable prediction that some time in this or the next century intelligence will escape from the constraints of biology." Price voices concern that as computers become smarter than humans, humans could someday be destroyed by "machines that are not malicious, but machines whose interests don't include us", and seeks to push this concern forward in the "respectable scientific community". Around 2015, he assumed the directorship of the new Leverhulme Centre for the Future of Intelligence, stating "Machine intelligence will be one of the defining themes of our century, and the challenges of ensuring that we make good use of its opportunities are ones we all face together. At present, however, we have barely begun to consider its ramifications, good or bad."

== Publications ==
- Facts and the Function of Truth (Blackwell, 1988)
- Time's Arrow and Archimedes' Point: New Directions for the Physics of Time (Oxford University Press, 1996)
- Naturalism without Mirrors (Oxford University Press, 2011)
- Causation, Physics, and the Constitution of Reality: Russell's Republic Revisited ed. with Richard Corry (Oxford University Press, 2007)
- Expressivism, Pragmatism and Representationalism (Cambridge University Press, 2013)
