= Many-worlds interpretation =

Interpretation of quantum mechanics

The quantum-mechanical "Schrödinger's cat" paradox according to the many-worlds interpretation. In this interpretation, every quantum event is a branch point; the cat is both alive and dead, even after the box is opened, but the "alive" and "dead" cats are in different branches of the multiverse, both of which are equally real, but which do not interact with each other.

The many-worlds interpretation (MWI) is an interpretation of quantum mechanics that asserts that the universal wave function is objectively real, and that there is no wave function collapse. This implies that all possible outcomes of quantum measurements are physically realized in different "worlds". The evolution of reality as a whole in MWI is rigidly deterministic and dynamically local. Many-worlds is also called the relative state formulation or the Everett interpretation, after physicist Hugh Everett, who first proposed it in 1957. Bryce DeWitt popularized the formulation and named it many-worlds in the 1970s.

In modern versions of many-worlds, the subjective appearance of wave function collapse is explained by the mechanism of quantum decoherence. Decoherence approaches to interpreting quantum theory have been widely explored and developed since the 1970s. MWI is considered a mainstream interpretation of quantum mechanics, along with the other decoherence interpretations, the Copenhagen interpretation, and hidden variable theories such as Bohmian mechanics.

In the many-worlds interpretation, the universal wave function evolves unitarily without collapse. Interactions lead to decoherence, producing dynamically independent components of the wave function that correspond to different macroscopic outcomes. These components are sometimes called "worlds", though they are emergent, approximate, and not fundamental entities. This is intended to resolve the measurement problem and thus some paradoxes of quantum theory, such as Wigner's friend, the Einstein–Podolsky–Rosen (EPR) paradox and Schrödinger's cat, since the universal wave function contains components corresponding to every possible outcome of a quantum event.

== Overview of the interpretation ==
The many-worlds interpretation's key idea is that the linear and unitary dynamics of quantum mechanics applies everywhere and at all times and so describes the whole universe. In particular, it models a measurement as a unitary transformation, a correlation-inducing interaction, between observer and object, without using a collapse postulate, and models observers as ordinary quantum-mechanical systems. This stands in contrast to the Copenhagen interpretation, in which a measurement is a "primitive" concept, not describable by unitary quantum mechanics; using the Copenhagen interpretation the universe is divided into a quantum and a classical domain, and the collapse postulate is central. In MWI, there is no division between classical and quantum: everything is quantum and there is no collapse. MWI's main conclusion is that the universe (or multiverse in this context) is composed of a quantum superposition of an uncountable or undefinable amount or number of increasingly divergent, non-communicating parallel universes or quantum worlds. Sometimes dubbed Everett worlds, each is an internally consistent and actualized alternative history or timeline.

The many-worlds interpretation uses decoherence to explain the measurement process and the emergence of a quasi-classical world. Wojciech H. Zurek, one of decoherence theory's pioneers, said: "Under scrutiny of the environment, only pointer states remain unchanged. Other states decohere into mixtures of stable pointer states that can persist, and, in this sense, exist: They are einselected". Zurek emphasizes that his work does not depend on a particular interpretation. (Note: "Relative states of Everett come to mind. One could speculate about reality of branches with other outcomes. We abstain from this; our discussion is interpretation-free, and this is a virtue.")

The many-worlds interpretation shares many similarities with the decoherent histories interpretation, which also uses decoherence to explain the process of measurement or wave function collapse. MWI treats the other histories or worlds as real, since it regards the universal wave function as the "basic physical entity" or "the fundamental entity, obeying at all times a deterministic wave equation". The decoherent histories interpretation, on the other hand, needs only one of the histories (or worlds) to be real.

Several authors, including Everett, John Archibald Wheeler and David Deutsch, call many-worlds a theory or metatheory, rather than just an interpretation. Everett argued that it was the "only completely coherent approach to explaining both the contents of quantum mechanics and the appearance of the world". Deutsch dismissed the idea that many-worlds is an "interpretation", saying that to call it an interpretation "is like talking about dinosaurs as an 'interpretation' of fossil records".

=== Formulation ===
In his 1957 doctoral dissertation, Everett proposed that, rather than relying on external observation for analysis of isolated quantum systems, one could mathematically model an object, as well as its observers, as purely physical systems within the mathematical framework developed by Paul Dirac, John von Neumann, and others, discarding altogether the ad hoc mechanism of wave function collapse.

=== Relative state ===
Everett's original work introduced the concept of a relative state. Two (or more) subsystems, after a general interaction, become correlated, or as is now said, entangled. Everett noted that such entangled systems can be expressed as the sum of products of states, where the two or more subsystems are each in a state relative to each other. After a measurement or observation one of the pair (or triple, etc.) is the measured, object or observed system, and one other member is the measuring apparatus (which may include an observer) having recorded the state of the measured system. Each product of subsystem states in the overall superposition evolves over time independently of other products. Once the subsystems interact, their states have become correlated or entangled and can no longer be considered independent. In Everett's terminology, each subsystem state was now correlated with its relative state, since each subsystem must now be considered relative to the other subsystems with which it has interacted.

In the example of Schrödinger's cat, after the box is opened, the entangled system is the cat, the poison vial and the observer. One relative triple of states would be the alive cat, the unbroken vial and the observer seeing an alive cat. Another relative triple of states would be the dead cat, the broken vial and the observer seeing a dead cat.

In the example of a measurement of a continuous variable (e.g., position q), the object-observer system decomposes into a continuum of pairs of relative states: the object system's relative state becomes a Dirac delta function each centered on a particular value of q and the corresponding observer relative state representing an observer having recorded the value of q. The states of the pairs of relative states are, post measurement, correlated with each other.

In Everett's scheme, there is no collapse; instead, the Schrödinger equation, or its quantum field theory, relativistic analog, holds all the time, everywhere. An observation or measurement is modeled by applying the wave equation to the entire system, comprising the object being observed and the observer. One consequence is that every observation causes the combined observer–object's wave function to change into a quantum superposition of two or more non-interacting branches.

Thus the process of measurement or observation, or any correlation-inducing interaction, splits the system into sets of relative states, where each set of relative states, forming a branch of the universal wave function, is consistent within itself, and all future measurements (including by multiple observers) will confirm this consistency.

=== Renamed many-worlds ===
Everett had referred to the combined observer–object system as split by an observation, each split corresponding to the different or multiple possible outcomes of an observation. These splits generate a branching tree, where each branch is a set of all the states relative to each other. Bryce DeWitt popularized Everett's work with a series of publications calling it the Many Worlds Interpretation. Focusing on the splitting process, DeWitt introduced the term "world" to describe a single branch of that tree, which is a consistent history. All observations or measurements within any branch are consistent within themselves.

Since many observation-like events have happened and are constantly happening, Everett's model implies that there are an enormous and growing number of simultaneously existing states or "worlds". (Note: "every quantum transition taking place on every star, in every galaxy, in every remote corner of the universe is splitting our local world on earth into myriads of copies of itself." DeWitt later softened this extreme view, viewing splitting as decoherence driven and local, in line with other modern commentators.)

=== Properties ===
MWI removes the observer-dependent role in the quantum measurement process by replacing wave function collapse with the established mechanism of quantum decoherence. As the observer's role lies at the heart of all "quantum paradoxes" such as the EPR paradox and von Neumann's "boundary problem", this provides a clearer and easier approach to their resolution.

Since the Copenhagen interpretation requires the existence of a classical domain beyond the one described by quantum mechanics, it has been criticized as inadequate for the study of cosmology. While there is no evidence that Everett was inspired by issues of cosmology, he developed his theory with the explicit goal of allowing quantum mechanics to be applied to the universe as a whole, hoping to stimulate the discovery of new phenomena. This hope has been realized in the later development of quantum cosmology.

MWI is a realist, deterministic and dynamically local theory. It achieves this by removing wave function collapse, which is indeterministic and nonlocal, from the deterministic and local equations of quantum theory.

MWI (like other, broader multiverse theories) provides a context for the anthropic principle, which may provide an explanation for the fine-tuned universe.

MWI depends crucially on the linearity of quantum mechanics, which underpins the superposition principle. If the final theory of everything is non-linear with respect to wave functions, then many-worlds is invalid. All quantum field theories are linear and compatible with the MWI, a point Everett emphasized as a motivation for the MWI. While quantum gravity or string theory may be non-linear in this respect, there is as yet no evidence of this.

Weingarten and Taylor & McCulloch have made separate proposals for how to define wave function branches in terms of quantum circuit complexity.

=== Alternative to wave function collapse ===
As with the other interpretations of quantum mechanics, the many-worlds interpretation is motivated by behavior that can be illustrated by the double-slit experiment. When particles of light (or anything else) pass through the double slit, a calculation assuming wavelike behavior of light can be used to identify where the particles are likely to be observed. Yet when the particles are observed in this experiment, they appear as particles (i.e., at definite places) and not as non-localized waves.

Some versions of the Copenhagen interpretation of quantum mechanics proposed a process of "collapse" in which an indeterminate quantum system would probabilistically collapse onto, or select, just one determinate outcome to "explain" this phenomenon of observation. Wave function collapse was widely regarded as artificial and ad hoc, so an alternative interpretation in which the behavior of measurement could be understood from more fundamental physical principles was considered desirable.

Everett's PhD work provided such an interpretation. He argued that for a composite system—such as a subject (the "observer" or measuring apparatus) observing an object (the "observed" system, such as a particle)—the claim that either the observer or the observed has a well-defined state is meaningless; in modern parlance, the observer and the observed have become entangled: we can only specify the state of one relative to the other, i.e., the state of the observer and the observed are correlated after the observation is made. This led Everett to derive from the unitary, deterministic dynamics alone (i.e., without assuming wave function collapse) the notion of a relativity of states.

Everett noticed that the unitary, deterministic dynamics alone entailed that after an observation is made each element of the quantum superposition of the combined subject–object wave function contains two "relative states": a "collapsed" object state and an associated observer who has observed the same collapsed outcome; what the observer sees and the state of the object have become correlated by the act of measurement or observation. The subsequent evolution of each pair of relative subject–object states proceeds with complete indifference as to the presence or absence of the other elements, as if wave function collapse has occurred, which has the consequence that later observations are always consistent with the earlier observations. Thus the appearance of the object's wave function's collapse has emerged from the unitary, deterministic theory itself. (This answered Einstein's early criticism of quantum theory: that the theory should define what is observed, not for the observables to define the theory.) (Note: "Whether you can observe a thing or not depends on the theory which you use. It is the theory which decides what can be observed."—Albert Einstein to Werner Heisenberg, objecting to placing observables at the heart of the new quantum mechanics, during Heisenberg's 1926 lecture at Berlin; related by Heisenberg in 1968.) Since the wave function appears to have collapsed then, Everett reasoned, there was no need to actually assume that it had collapsed. And so, invoking Occam's razor, he removed the postulate of wave function collapse from the theory.

=== Testability ===
In 1985, David Deutsch proposed a variant of the Wigner's friend thought experiment as a test of many-worlds versus the Copenhagen interpretation. It consists of an experimenter (Wigner's friend) making a measurement on a quantum system in an isolated laboratory, and another experimenter (Wigner) who would make a measurement on the first one. According to the many-worlds theory, the first experimenter would end up in a macroscopic superposition of seeing one result of the measurement in one branch, and another result in another branch. The second experimenter could then interfere these two branches in order to test whether it is in fact in a macroscopic superposition or has collapsed into a single branch, as predicted by the Copenhagen interpretation. Since then Lockwood, Vaidman, and others have made similar proposals, which require placing macroscopic objects in a coherent superposition and interfering them, a task currently beyond experimental capability.

== Probability and the Born rule ==
Since the many-worlds interpretation's inception, physicists have been puzzled about the role of probability in it. As put by Wallace, there are two facets to the question: the incoherence problem, which asks why we should assign probabilities at all to outcomes that are certain to occur in some worlds, and the quantitative problem, which asks why the probabilities should be given by the Born rule.

Everett tried to answer these questions in the paper that introduced many-worlds. To address the incoherence problem, he argued that an observer who makes a sequence of measurements on a quantum system will in general have an apparently random sequence of results in their memory, which justifies the use of probabilities to describe the measurement process. To address the quantitative problem, Everett proposed a derivation of the Born rule based on the properties that a measure on the branches of the wave function should have. His derivation has been criticized as relying on unmotivated assumptions. Since then several other derivations of the Born rule in the many-worlds framework have been proposed. There is no consensus on whether this has been successful.

=== Frequentism ===
DeWitt and Graham and Farhi et al., among others, have proposed derivations of the Born rule based on a frequentist interpretation of probability. They try to show that in the limit of uncountably many measurements, no worlds would have relative frequencies that didn't match the probabilities given by the Born rule, but these derivations have been shown to be mathematically incorrect.

=== Decision theory ===
A decision-theoretic derivation of the Born rule was produced by David Deutsch (1999) and refined by Wallace and Saunders. They consider an agent who takes part in a quantum gamble: the agent makes a measurement on a quantum system, branches as a consequence, and each of the agent's future selves receives a reward that depends on the measurement result. The agent uses decision theory to evaluate the price they would pay to take part in such a gamble, and concludes that the price is given by the utility of the rewards weighted according to the Born rule. Some reviews have been positive, although these arguments remain highly controversial; some theoretical physicists have taken them as supporting the case for parallel universes. For example, a New Scientist story on a 2007 conference about Everettian interpretations quoted physicist Andy Albrecht as saying, "This work will go down as one of the most important developments in the history of science". In contrast, the philosopher Huw Price, also attending the conference, found the Deutsch–Wallace–Saunders approach fundamentally flawed.

=== Symmetries and invariance ===
In 2005, Zurek produced a derivation of the Born rule based on the symmetries of entangled states; Schlosshauer and Fine argue that Zurek's derivation is not rigorous, as it does not define what probability is and has several unstated assumptions about how it should behave.

In 2016, Charles Sebens and Sean M. Carroll, building on work by Lev Vaidman, proposed a similar approach based on self-locating uncertainty. In this approach, decoherence creates multiple identical copies of observers, who can assign credences to being on different branches using the Born rule. The Sebens–Carroll approach has been criticized by Adrian Kent, and Vaidman does not find it satisfactory.

=== Branch counting ===
In 2021, Simon Saunders produced a branch counting derivation of the Born rule. The crucial feature of this approach is to define the branches so that they all have the same magnitude or 2-norm. The ratios of the numbers of branches thus defined give the probabilities of the various outcomes of a measurement, in accordance with the Born rule.

== Preferred basis problem ==
As originally formulated by Everett and DeWitt, the many-worlds interpretation had a privileged role for measurements: they determined which basis of a quantum system would give rise to the eponymous worlds. Without this the theory was ambiguous, as a quantum state can equally well be described (e.g.) as having a well-defined position or as being a superposition of two delocalized states. The assumption is that the preferred basis to use is the one which assigns a unique measurement outcome to each world. This special role for measurements is problematic for the theory, as it contradicts Everett and DeWitt's goal of having a reductionist theory and undermines their criticism of the ill-defined measurement postulate of the Copenhagen interpretation. This is known today as the preferred basis problem.

The preferred basis problem has been solved, according to Saunders and Wallace, among others, by incorporating decoherence into the many-worlds theory. In this approach, the preferred basis does not have to be postulated, but rather is identified as the basis stable under environmental decoherence. In this way measurements no longer play a special role; rather, any interaction that causes decoherence causes the world to split. Since decoherence is never complete, there will always remain some infinitesimal overlap between two worlds, making it arbitrary whether a pair of worlds has split or not. Wallace argues that this is not problematic: it only shows that worlds are not a part of the fundamental ontology, but rather of the emergent ontology, where these approximate, effective descriptions are routine in the physical sciences. Since in this approach the worlds are derived, it follows that they must be present in any other interpretation of quantum mechanics that does not have a collapse mechanism, such as Bohmian mechanics.

This approach to deriving the preferred basis has been criticized as creating circularity with derivations of probability in the many-worlds interpretation, as decoherence theory depends on probability and probability depends on the ontology derived from decoherence. Wallace contends that decoherence theory depends not on probability but only on the notion that one is allowed to do approximations in physics.

== History ==
MWI originated in Everett's Princeton University PhD thesis "The Theory of the Universal Wave Function", developed under his thesis advisor John Archibald Wheeler, a shorter summary of which was published in 1957 under the title "Relative State Formulation of Quantum Mechanics" (Wheeler contributed the title "relative state"; Everett originally called his approach the "Correlation Interpretation", where "correlation" refers to quantum entanglement). The phrase "many-worlds" is due to Bryce DeWitt, who was responsible for the wider popularization of Everett's theory, which had been largely ignored for a decade after publication in 1957.

Everett's proposal was not without precedent. In 1952, Erwin Schrödinger gave a lecture in Dublin in which at one point he jocularly warned his audience that what he was about to say might "seem lunatic". He went on to assert that while the Schrödinger equation seemed to be describing several different histories, they were "not alternatives but all really happen simultaneously". According to David Deutsch, this is the earliest known reference to many-worlds; Jeffrey A. Barrett describes it as indicating the similarity of "general views" between Everett and Schrödinger. Schrödinger's writings from the period also contain elements resembling the modal interpretation originated by Bas van Fraassen. Because Schrödinger subscribed to a kind of post-Machian neutral monism, in which "matter" and "mind" are only different aspects or arrangements of the same common elements, treating the wave function as physical and treating it as information became interchangeable.

Leon Cooper and Deborah Van Vechten developed a very similar approach before reading Everett's work. Zeh also came to the same conclusions as Everett before reading his work, then built a new theory of quantum decoherence based on these ideas.

According to people who knew him, Everett believed in the literal reality of the other quantum worlds. His son and wife reported that he "never wavered in his belief over his many-worlds theory". In their detailed review of Everett's work, Osnaghi, Freitas, and Freire Jr. note that Everett consistently used quotes around "real" to indicate a meaning within scientific practice.

== Reception ==
MWI's initial reception was overwhelmingly negative, in the sense that it was ignored, with the notable exception of DeWitt. Wheeler made considerable efforts to formulate the theory in a way that would be palatable to Bohr, visited Copenhagen in 1956 to discuss it with him, and convinced Everett to visit as well, which happened in 1959. Nevertheless, Bohr and his collaborators completely rejected the theory. (Note: Everett recounted his meeting with Bohr as "that was a hell ... doomed from the beginning". Léon Rosenfeld, a close collaborator of Bohr, said "With regard to Everett neither I nor even Niels Bohr could have any patience with him, when he visited us in Copenhagen more than 12 years ago in order to sell the hopelessly wrong ideas he had been encouraged, most unwisely, by Wheeler to develop. He was undescribably[sic] stupid and could not understand the simplest things in quantum mechanics.") Everett had already left academia in 1957, never to return, and in 1980, Wheeler disavowed the theory.

=== Support ===
One of the strongest longtime advocates of MWI is David Deutsch. According to him, the single photon interference pattern observed in the double slit experiment can be explained by interference of photons in multiple universes. Viewed this way, the single photon interference experiment is indistinguishable from the multiple photon interference experiment. In a more practical vein, in one of the earliest papers on quantum computing, Deutsch suggested that parallelism that results from MWI could lead to "a method by which certain probabilistic tasks can be performed faster by a universal quantum computer than by any classical restriction of it". He also proposed that MWI will be testable (at least against "naive" Copenhagenism) when reversible computers become conscious via the reversible observation of spin.

=== Equivocal ===
Philosophers of science James Ladyman and Don Ross say that MWI could be true, but do not embrace it. They note that no quantum theory is yet empirically adequate for describing all of reality, given its lack of unification with general relativity, and so do not see a reason to regard any interpretation of quantum mechanics as the final word in metaphysics. They also suggest that the multiple branches may be an artifact of incomplete descriptions and of using quantum mechanics to represent the states of macroscopic objects. They argue that macroscopic objects are significantly different from microscopic objects in not being isolated from the environment, and that using quantum formalism to describe them lacks explanatory and descriptive power and accuracy.

=== Rejection ===
Some scientists consider some aspects of MWI to be unfalsifiable and hence unscientific because the multiple parallel universes are non-communicating, in the sense that no information can be passed between them.

Victor J. Stenger remarked that Murray Gell-Mann's published work explicitly rejects the existence of simultaneous parallel universes. Collaborating with James Hartle, Gell-Mann worked toward the development of a more "palatable" post-Everett quantum mechanics. Stenger thought it fair to say that most physicists find MWI too extreme, though it "has merit in finding a place for the observer inside the system being analyzed and doing away with the troublesome notion of wave function collapse". (Note: "Gell-Mann and Hartle, along with a score of others, have been working to develop a more palatable interpretation of quantum mechanics that is free of the problems that plague all the interpretations we have considered so far. This new interpretation is called, in its various incarnations, post-Everett quantum mechanics, alternate histories, consistent histories, or decoherent histories. I will not be overly concerned with the detailed differences between these characterizations and will use the terms more or less interchangeably.")

Roger Penrose argues that the idea is flawed because it is based on an oversimplified version of quantum mechanics that does not account for gravity. In his view, applying conventional quantum mechanics to the universe implies the MWI, but the lack of a successful theory of quantum gravity negates the claimed universality of conventional quantum mechanics. According to Penrose, "the rules must change when gravity is involved". He further asserts that gravity helps anchor reality and "blurry" events have only one allowable outcome: "electrons, atoms, molecules, etc., are so minute that they require almost no amount of energy to maintain their gravity, and therefore their overlapping states. They can stay in that state forever, as described in standard quantum theory". On the other hand, "in the case of large objects, the duplicate states disappear in an instant due to the fact that these objects create a large gravitational field".

Philosopher of science Robert P. Crease says that MWI is "one of the most implausible and unrealistic ideas in the history of science" because it means that everything conceivable happens. Science writer Philip Ball calls MWI's implications fantasies, since "beneath their apparel of scientific equations or symbolic logic, they are acts of imagination, of 'just supposing'".

Theoretical physicist Gerard 't Hooft also dismisses the idea: "I do not believe that we have to live with the many-worlds interpretation. Indeed, it would be a stupendous number of parallel worlds, which are only there because physicists couldn't decide which of them is real".

Asher Peres was an outspoken critic of MWI. A section of his 1993 textbook had the title Everett's interpretation and other bizarre theories. Peres argued that the various many-worlds interpretations merely shift the arbitrariness or vagueness of the collapse postulate to the question of when "worlds" can be regarded as separate, and that no objective criterion for that separation can actually be formulated.

=== Polls ===
A poll of 72 "leading quantum cosmologists and other quantum field theorists" conducted before 1991 by L. David Raub showed 58% agreement with "Yes, I think MWI is true".

Max Tegmark reports the result of a "highly unscientific" poll taken at a 1997 quantum mechanics workshop. According to Tegmark, "The many worlds interpretation (MWI) scored second, comfortably ahead of the consistent histories and Bohm interpretations".

In response to Sean M. Carroll's statement "As crazy as it sounds, most working physicists buy into the many-worlds theory", Michael Nielsen counters: "at a quantum computing conference at Cambridge in 1998, a many-worlder surveyed the audience of approximately 200 people ... Many-worlds did just fine, garnering support on a level comparable to, but somewhat below, Copenhagen and decoherence". But Nielsen notes that it seemed most attendees found it to be a waste of time: Peres "got a huge and sustained round of applause…when he got up at the end of the polling and asked 'And who here believes the laws of physics are decided by a democratic vote?'".

A 2005 poll of fewer than 40 students and researchers taken after a course on the Interpretation of Quantum Mechanics at the Institute for Quantum Computing at the University of Waterloo found "Many Worlds (and decoherence)" to be the least favored.

A 2011 poll of 33 participants at an Austrian conference on quantum foundations found 6 endorsed MWI, 8 "Information-based/information-theoretical", and 14 Copenhagen; the authors remark that MWI received a similar percentage of votes as in Tegmark's 1997 poll.

== Speculative implications ==
DeWitt has said that Everett, Wheeler, and Graham "do not in the end exclude any element of the superposition. All the worlds are there, even those in which everything goes wrong and all the statistical laws break down". Tegmark affirmed that absurd or highly unlikely events are rare but inevitable under MWI: "Things inconsistent with the laws of physics will never happen—everything else will ... it's important to keep track of the statistics, since even if everything conceivable happens somewhere, really freak events happen only exponentially rarely". David Deutsch speculates in his book The Beginning of Infinity that some fiction, such as alternate history, could occur somewhere in the multiverse, as long as it is consistent with the laws of physics.

According to Ladyman and Ross, many seemingly physically plausible but unrealized possibilities, such as those discussed in other scientific fields, generally have no counterparts in other branches, because they are in fact incompatible with the universal wave function. According to Carroll, human decision-making, contrary to common misconceptions, is best thought of as a classical process, not a quantum one, because it works on the level of neurochemistry rather than fundamental particles. Human decisions do not cause the world to branch into equally realized outcomes; even for subjectively difficult decisions, the "weight" of realized outcomes is almost entirely concentrated in a single branch.

Quantum suicide is a thought experiment in quantum mechanics and the philosophy of physics that can purportedly distinguish between the Copenhagen interpretation of quantum mechanics and the many-worlds interpretation by a variation of the Schrödinger's cat thought experiment, from the cat's point of view. Quantum immortality refers to the subjective experience of surviving quantum suicide. Most experts believe the experiment would not work in the real world, because the world with the surviving experimenter has a lower "measure" than the world before the experiment, making it less likely that the experimenter will experience their survival.

== See also ==
- Alternate history
- Consistent histories
- Many-minds interpretation
- "The Garden of Forking Paths"
- Parallel universes in fiction
- The Beginning of Infinity
- Mathematical universe hypothesis
- Multiverse
