= Hugh Everett III =

American scientist (1930–1982)

- Everett in 1964
- Born: November 11, 1930; Washington, D.C., U.S.
- Died: July 19, 1982 (aged 51); McLean, Virginia, U.S.
- Education: Catholic University of America; Princeton University (PhD)
- Known for: Many-worlds interpretation Everett's theorem
- Children: 2
- Scientific career
- Fields: Physics; Operations research Optimization; Game theory
- Workplaces: Institute for Defense Analyses; American Management Systems; Monowave Corporation
- Thesis: On the foundations of quantum mechanics (1957)
- Doctoral advisor: John Archibald Wheeler

Hugh Everett III (/ˈɛvərɪt/; November 11, 1930 – July 19, 1982) was an American physicist who proposed the relative state interpretation of quantum mechanics. This influential approach later became the basis of the many-worlds interpretation (MWI). Everett's theory dropped the wave function collapse postulate of quantum measurement theory, incorporating the observer in the same quantum state as the observation result. The quantum statistic becomes a measure of the branching of the universal wave function.

Although largely disregarded until near the end of his life, Everett's work received more credibility with the discovery of quantum decoherence in the 1970s and has received increased attention in recent decades, with MWI becoming one of the important interpretations of quantum mechanics.

Everett also helped found small companies specializing in contracts with the U.S. government.

== Early life and education ==
Hugh Everett III was born in 1930 and raised in the Washington, D.C. area. His parents separated when he was young. Initially raised by his mother (Katherine Lucille Everett, née Kennedy), he was raised by his father (Hugh Everett, Jr.) and stepmother (Sarah Everett, née Thrift) from the age of seven.

At age 12, Everett wrote a letter to Albert Einstein asking him whether that which maintained the universe was something random or unifying. Einstein responded as follows:

Dear Hugh: There is no such thing like an irresistible force and immovable body. But there seems to be a very stubborn boy who has forced his way victoriously through strange difficulties created by himself for this purpose. Sincerely yours, A. Einstein

Everett won a half scholarship to St. John's College High School in Washington, D.C. From there, he moved to the nearby Catholic University of America to study chemical engineering as an undergraduate. There, he read about Dianetics in Astounding Science Fiction. Although he never exhibited interest in Scientology (which Dianetics became), he retained a distrust of conventional medicine throughout his life.

During World War II, Everett's father was fighting in Europe as a lieutenant colonel on the general staff. After the war, Everett's father was stationed in West Germany, and Everett joined him in 1949, taking a year off from his undergraduate studies. Father and son were both keen photographers and took hundreds of pictures of West Germany being rebuilt. Reflecting their technical interests, the pictures were "almost devoid of people".

Everett graduated from the Catholic University of America in 1953 with a degree in chemical engineering, although he had completed sufficient courses for a mathematics degree as well.

== Princeton ==
Everett received a National Science Foundation fellowship that allowed him to attend Princeton University for graduate studies. He started his studies at Princeton in the mathematics department, where he worked on the nascent field of game theory under Albert W. Tucker, but slowly drifted into physics. In 1953 he took his first physics courses, notably Introductory Quantum Mechanics with Robert Dicke.

In 1954, Everett took Methods of Mathematical Physics with Eugene Wigner, although he remained active in mathematics and presented a paper on military game theory in December. He passed his general examinations in the spring of 1955, thereby gaining his master's degree, and then started work on his dissertation that would (much) later make him famous. He switched thesis advisor to John Archibald Wheeler sometime in 1955, wrote a couple of short papers on quantum theory, and completed his long paper "Wave Mechanics Without Probability" in April 1956.

In his third year at Princeton, Everett moved into an apartment he shared with three friends he had made during his first year, Hale Trotter, Harvey Arnold and Charles Misner. Arnold later described Everett as follows:

He was smart in a very broad way. I mean, to go from chemical engineering to mathematics to physics and spending most of the time buried in a science fiction book, I mean, this is talent.

During this time, Everett met Nancy Gore, who typed up his paper "Wave Mechanics Without Probability". He married her the next year. The paper was later retitled "The Theory of the Universal Wave Function".

Wheeler traveled to Copenhagen in May 1956 with the goal of getting a favorable reception for at least part of Everett's work, but in vain.

== Career ==
In danger of losing his draft deferment, Everett took a research job with the Pentagon the year before completing the oral exam for his PhD and did not continue research in theoretical physics after his graduation. He started defense work in the Weapons Systems Evaluation Group (WSEG) in June 1956. Completing his PhD within a year of starting at WSEG was a job requirement, and in April 1957 he returned briefly to Princeton to defend his thesis. The oral examination took place on April 23. The principal examiners—Wheeler, Valentine Bargmann, H. W. Wyld, and Dicke—concluded: "The candidate passed a very good examination. He dealt with a very difficult subject and defended his conclusions firmly, clearly, and logically. He shows marked mathematical ability, keenness in logic analyses, and a high ability to express himself well." With this Everett completed his PhD in physics from Princeton, his doctoral dissertation titled "On the foundations of quantum mechanics".

A short article, which was a compromise between Everett and Wheeler about how to present the many-worlds concept and almost identical to the final version of his thesis, was published in Reviews of Modern Physics, accompanied by a favorable review by Wheeler. Everett was not happy with the article's final form.

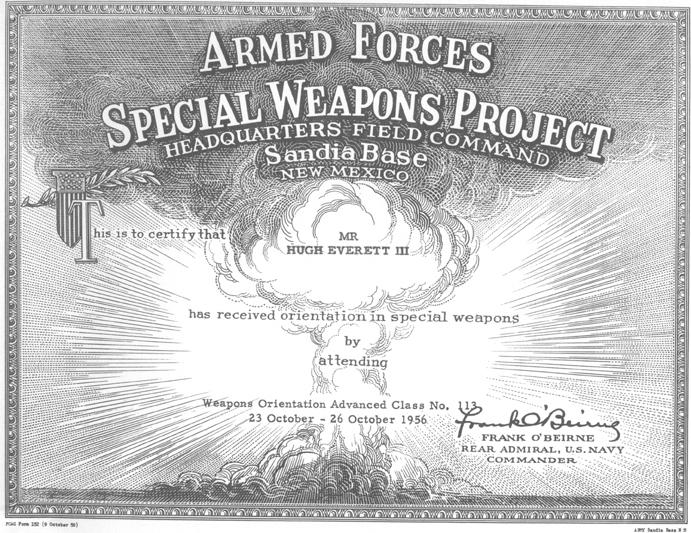
Everett's attendance marked the transition from academia to commercial work.

On October 23–26, 1956, Everett attended a weapons orientation course managed by Sandia National Laboratories at Albuquerque, New Mexico, to learn about nuclear weapons, and became a fan of computer modeling while there. In 1957, he became director of the WSEG's Department of Physical and Mathematical Sciences. Much, but not all, of Everett's research at WSEG remains classified. He worked on various studies of the Minuteman missile project, which was then starting, as well as the influential study The Distribution and Effects of Fallout in Large Nuclear Weapon Campaigns.

During March and April 1959, Everett visited Copenhagen at Wheeler's request in order to meet with Niels Bohr, the "father of the Copenhagen interpretation of quantum mechanics". The visit was a complete disaster; Bohr "rejected Everett’s approach as a whole, defending the Copenhagen approach to measurement". The conceptual gulf between their positions was too wide to allow any meeting of minds; Léon Rosenfeld, one of Bohr's devotees, called Everett "undescribably stupid" and said he "could not understand the simplest things in quantum mechanics". Everett later described this experience as "hell...doomed from the beginning". (Note: Everett recounted his meeting with Bohr as "that was a hell... doomed from the beginning". Léon Rosenfeld, a close collaborator of Bohr, said "With regard to Everett neither I nor even Niels Bohr could have any patience with him, when he visited us in Copenhagen more than 12 years ago in order to sell the hopelessly wrong ideas he had been encouraged, most unwisely, by Wheeler to develop. He was undescribably[sic] stupid and could not understand the simplest things in quantum mechanics.")

While in Copenhagen, Everett started work on a new idea to use generalized Lagrange multipliers for mathematical optimization. His theorem, published in 1963, relates the Lagrangian bidual to the primal problem. Lagrange multipliers are relevant to operations research, and Everett applied his discovery commercially as a defense analyst and a consultant.

In 1962 Everett accepted an invitation to present the relative-state formulation (as it was still called) at a conference on the foundations of quantum mechanics at Xavier University. In his exposition Everett presented his derivation of probability and also stated explicitly that observers in all branches of the wavefunction were equally "real." He also agreed with an observation by Boris Podolsky that "It looks like we would have a non-denumerable infinity of worlds".

In August 1964, Everett and several WSEG colleagues started Lambda Corp. to apply military modeling solutions to various civilian problems. During the early 1970s, defense budgets were curtailed and most money went to operational duties in the Vietnam War, resulting in Lambda eventually being absorbed by the General Research Corp.

In 1973, Everett and Donald Reisler (a Lambda colleague and fellow physicist) left the firm to establish DBS Corporation in Arlington, Virginia. Although the firm conducted defense research (including work on United States Navy ship maintenance optimization and weapons applications), it primarily specialized in "analyzing the socioeconomic effects of government affirmative action programs" as a contractor under the auspices of the Department of Justice and the Department of Health, Education and Welfare. For a while, the company was partially supported by American Management Systems, a business consulting firm that drew upon algorithms Everett developed. He concurrently held a non-administrative vice presidency at AMS and was frequently consulted by the firm's founders.

Everett cultivated an early aptitude for computer programming at IDA and favored the TRS-80 at DBS, where he primarily worked for the rest of his life.

== Later recognition ==
In 1970, Bryce DeWitt wrote an article for Physics Today on Everett's relative-state theory, which he dubbed many-worlds, which prompted a number of letters from physicists. (Note: The term "many-worlds" was coined by Bryce DeWitt, but David Deutsch, having met Everett for dinner in 1977, says that Everett was actually excited by the term and defended it. "Relative state" was Wheeler's terminology—Everett's own original choice was "correlation interpretation".) These letters, and DeWitt's responses to the technical objections they raised, were also published. Meanwhile DeWitt, who had corresponded with Everett on the many-worlds/relative state interpretation when it was published in 1957, started editing an anthology on the many-worlds interpretation. In addition to the original articles by Everett and Wheeler, the anthology was dominated by Everett's 1956 paper "The Theory of the Universal Wavefunction", which had not been published before. The book was published late in 1973 and sold out. In 1976 an article on Everett's work appeared in the science fiction magazine Analog.

In 1977, Everett was invited to give a talk at a conference Wheeler had organized at Wheeler's new location at the University of Texas at Austin. As with the Copenhagen visit, Everett vacationed from his defense work and traveled with his family. Everett met DeWitt there for the first and only time. His talk was quite well received and influenced a number of physicists in the audience, including Wheeler's graduate student David Deutsch, who later promoted the many-worlds interpretation to a wider audience. Everett, who "never wavered in his belief in his many-worlds theory", enjoyed the presentation; it was the first time in years he had talked about his quantum work in public. But he did little to promote his theory, saying, "[I] had washed my hands of the whole affair in 1956". Wheeler started the process of returning Everett to a physics career by establishing a new research institute in California, but nothing came of that proposal. In 1980, Wheeler said he thought the theory "creates too great a load of metaphysical baggage to carry along".

== Death and legacy ==
At age 51, Everett died of a heart attack at home on July 19, 1982. A committed atheist, he had asked that his remains be disposed of in the trash. His wife first kept his ashes in an urn, but complied with his wishes after a few years. Of the companies Everett initiated, only Monowave Corporation still existed as of 2023, in Seattle.

Everett's daughter, Elizabeth, died by suicide in 1996, and his wife died of cancer in 1998. Everett's son, the musician Mark Oliver Everett, also known as "E", is the main singer and songwriter for the band Eels. The Eels album Electro-Shock Blues, written during the late 1990s, was inspired by E's emotional response to these deaths.

Of Everett's death, Mark Everett later said:

I think about how angry I was that my dad didn't take better care of himself. How he never went to a doctor, let himself become grossly overweight, smoked three packs a day, drank like a fish and never exercised. But then I think about how his colleague mentioned that, days before dying, my dad had said he lived a good life and that he was satisfied. I realize that there is a certain value in my father's way of life. He ate, smoked and drank as he pleased, and one day he just suddenly and quickly died. Given some of the other choices I'd witnessed, it turns out that enjoying yourself and then dying quickly is not such a hard way to go.

Mark Everett explored his father's work in the BBC television documentary Parallel Worlds, Parallel Lives. In 2008, the program was edited and shown on the Public Broadcasting Service's Nova series in the U.S. In the program, Mark says he was unaware that his father was a brilliant and influential physicist until his death.

== See also ==
- Everett phone
