= Department of Physics (Princeton University) =

Academic department at Princeton University

Coordinates: 40°20′42″N 74°39′07″W

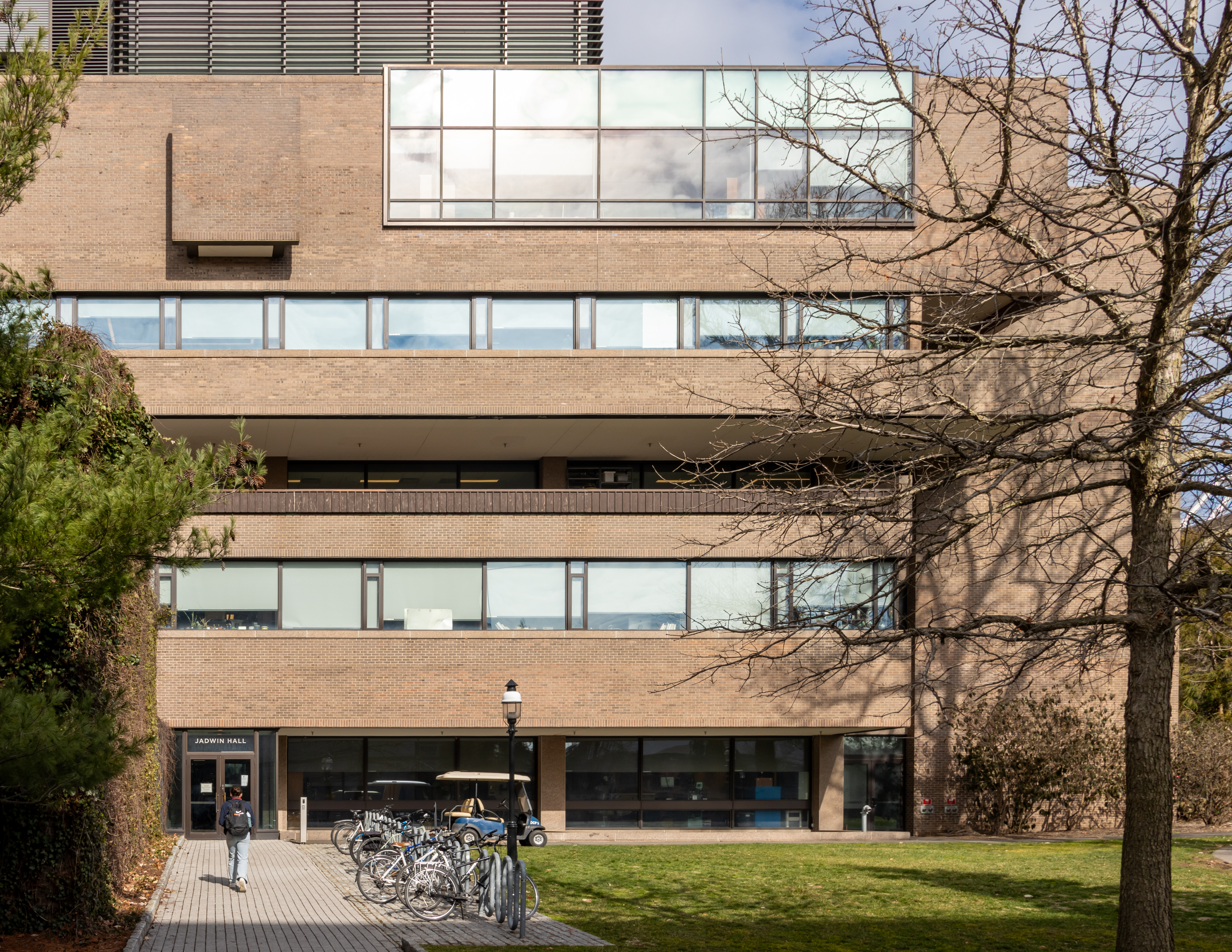
- Entrance to Jadwin Hall
- Type: Private
- Parent institution: Princeton University
- Dean: James Olsen
- Academic staff: 71 professors (2019)
- Location: Princeton, New Jersey, United States
- Website: phy.princeton.edu

The Department of Physics is the academic department for physics at Princeton University. The associated faculty members, researchers, and students have been recognized for their research contributions, having been awarded 19 Nobel Prizes, four National Medals of Science, and two Wolf Prizes in Physics. Notable professors, researchers, and graduate students affiliated with the department include Richard Phillips Feynman, Joseph H. Taylor, Jim Peebles, Eugene P. Wigner, and John von Neumann. In addition, the department offers degree programs for bachelor's students (A.B.) and doctoral students (Ph.D.).

== History ==
In 1832, the first classes in physics at Princeton were taught by Joseph Henry, who later served as the Secretary of the Smithsonian Institution and President of the National Academy of Sciences. Henry taught as a Professor of Natural Philosophy from 1832 to 1846, during which he earned a salary of $1,000 per year. Additional scholars that joined Princeton's physics department included Cyrus Fogg Brackett, William Magie, and Henry B. Fine. In 1873, Brackett became an adviser to the trustees in order to expand funding for scientific subjects. He later founded the department of electrical engineering and wrote the Textbook of Physics (1884) for his classes. In 1909, the Palmer Laboratory was established for use between the departments of physics and of electrical engineering. In 1925, four new professors were hired: Henry D. Smyth, Allen G. Shenstone, Louis A. Turner, and Charles Zahn. The hiring of these scholars sparked new interests in research on atomic energy and nuclear physics. In 1927, Arthur Compton was the first faculty member at Princeton to win the Nobel Prize in Physics. The physics department officially became independent from the engineering school in 1929. Following this separation, professors Philip Morse and Robert Van de Graaff joined the faculty. Later, theoretical physics grew in popularity with the hiring of Eugene P. Wigner and John von Neumann. Along with Oskar Morgenstern, a professor in the economics department, Wigner and John Archibald Wheeler were part of the Princeton Three, who sought to establish a national science laboratory as part of the American space race.

The department was once the home of Albert Einstein. Einstein first visited Princeton in 1921 where he delivered the Stafford Little lectures on the theory of relativity. The following year, he won the Nobel Prize in Physics. He then returned to the newly founded Institute for Advanced Study in 1922. Einstein's office was located in room 109 Fine Hall. While Einstein was not a professor and did not teach classes, he worked on his theory of relativity at Princeton and occasionally gave lectures on his research. John Archibald Wheeler, a professor of physics at Princeton (1938-1976) was influential in spearheading interests in general relativity in the United States after World War II. He is known for pioneering the term black holes in 1967, identifying them as objects with gravitational collapse, alongside physicist Robert H. Dicke. He has also conducted research on wormholes and the one-electron universe hypothesis.

== Academics ==
=== Undergraduates ===
The undergraduate curriculum offers flexibility for students interested in a wide range of subfields within the discipline. After completing a set of five prerequisite courses, students must take additional courses in quantum mechanics, thermodynamics, experimental physics, and complex analysis. Physics concentrators are required to complete a junior paper as a preliminary investigation into a senior thesis topic. Students are able to conduct research with faculty, either during the school year or the summer, through various programs at the university. Undergraduate courses are taught in small classes, and students receive direct feedback and support from faculty members throughout their time in the program.

=== Graduates ===
The graduate school offers a Doctor of Philosophy (PhD) in both theoretical physics and experimental physics. The strengths of the department include particle physics, gravity and cosmology, nuclear and atomic physics, and mathematical physics.

== Rankings ==
The Princeton Department of Physics is often ranked high in national and international rankings. According to US News, Princeton is ranked as No. 3 in Physics. In the World University Rankings 2019, Princeton was ranked as No. 1 in physical sciences. By research output, the department is tied for No. 1 with Harvard University, University of California at Berkeley, and the University of Hawaii at Manoa.

== Notable alumni ==
Notable alumni include the following:

- Kip S. Thorne, Ph.D. *65, winner of the Nobel Prize in Physics
- Frank Wilczek, Ph.D. *75, winner of the Nobel Prize in Physics
- Steven Weinberg, Ph.D. *57, winner of the Nobel Prize in Physics
- John Bardeen, Ph.D. *36, winner of the Nobel Prize in Physics
- Richard P. Feynman, Ph.D. *42, winner of the Nobel Prize in Physics
- Robert Hofstadter, Ph.D. *38, winner of the Nobel Prize in Physics
- Clinton J. Davisson, Ph.D. *11, winner of the Nobel Prize in Physics
- Arthur H. Compton, Ph.D. *16, winner of the Nobel Prize in Physics

== See also ==
- List of computational physics software
