= Delayed-choice quantum eraser =

Physics experiment in quantum mechanics

A delayed-choice quantum eraser experiment is an elaboration on the quantum eraser experiment that incorporates concepts considered in John Archibald Wheeler's delayed-choice experiment. The experiment was designed to investigate peculiar consequences of the well-known double-slit experiment in quantum mechanics, as well as the consequences of quantum entanglement.

Delayed-choice quantum eraser experiments are designed to investigate the following apparent paradox arising from the traditional double-slit experiment: if, upon observing a photon, one can deduce that it arrived at a detector by following a particular path, then "common sense" (which Wheeler and others challenge) says that it must have entered the double-slit device as a particle, whereas if the photon's path cannot be deduced, then it must have entered the double-slit device as a wave. By this logic, a spontaneous change in the mode of observation while the photon is in transit may force it to retroactively alter its initial "commitment" to exhibiting either wave-like or particle-like behavior. Wheeler pointed out that, if one imagines an experimental setup of interstellar proportions, this reasoning suggests that a last-minute decision made on Earth on how to observe a photon could alter a physical configuration established millions or even billions of years earlier.

While delayed-choice experiments might seem to allow decisions (about how to make measurements) to alter events that have already occurred by the time they have been made, this conclusion may only be reached by adopting a non-standard interpretation of quantum mechanics. Under the standard interpretation, a photon in transit is considered to be in a superposition of states only one of which is observed in the measurement.

== Introduction ==
In the basic double-slit experiment, a coherent beam of light (in practice, often a laser) is directed at two (parallel) narrow vertical slits in an otherwise solid barrier. If a detection screen is placed at a sufficient distance from the barrier on the other side, one will observe an interference pattern of alternating light and dark fringes. Other atomic-scale entities such as electrons are found to exhibit the same behavior when fired toward a double slit. By decreasing the brightness of the source sufficiently, individual particles that form the interference pattern are detectable. The emergence of an interference pattern suggests that each particle passing through the slits interferes with itself, and that therefore in some sense the particles are going through both slits at once. This is an idea that contradicts our everyday experience of discrete objects.

A well-known thought experiment, which played a vital role in the history of quantum mechanics (for example, see the discussion on Einstein's version of this experiment), demonstrated that if particle detectors are positioned at the slits, showing through which slit a photon goes, the interference pattern will disappear. This which-way experiment illustrates the complementarity principle that photons can behave as either particles or as waves, but cannot be simultaneously observed to be both a particle and a wave. Technical challenges of the thought experiment prevented realizations of this experiment before the 1970s; similar experiments can now be performed in undergraduate physics labs.

Which-path information and the visibility of interference fringes are complementary quantities, meaning that information about a photon's path can be observed, or interference fringes can be observed, but they cannot both be observed in the same trial. In the double-slit experiment, conventional wisdom held that observing the particles' path inevitably disturbed them enough to destroy the interference pattern as a result of the Heisenberg uncertainty principle.

In 1982, Scully and Drühl pointed out a workaround alternative to this interpretation. They proposed to save the information about which slit the photon went through - or, in their setup, from which atom the photon was re-emitted - in the excited state of that atom. At this point the which-path information is known and no interference is observed. However, one can "erase" this information by making the atom emit another photon and fall to the ground state. That on its own will not bring the interference pattern back, the which-path information can still be extracted from an appropriate measurement of the second photon. However, if the second photon is measured at a place where it could get to equally likely from any of the atoms, that successfully "erases" the which-path information. The original photon would now show the interference pattern (the position of its fringes depends on where exactly the second photon was observed, so that in the total statistics they average out and no fringes are seen). Since 1982, multiple experiments have demonstrated the validity of this so-called quantum "eraser". A form of the experiment closely matching Scully and Drühl concept was performed in 2000.

=== A simple quantum-eraser experiment ===
A simple version of the quantum eraser can be described as follows: Rather than splitting one photon or its probability wave between two slits, the photon is subjected to a beam splitter. If one thinks in terms of a stream of photons being randomly directed by such a beam splitter to go down two paths that are kept from interaction, it would seem that no photon can then interfere with any other or with itself.

If the rate of photon production is reduced so that only one photon enters the apparatus at any one time, it becomes impossible to understand the photon as only moving through one path, because when the path outputs are redirected so that they coincide on a common detector or detectors, interference phenomena appear. This is similar to envisioning one photon in a two-slit apparatus: even though it is one photon, it still somehow interacts with both slits.

Figure 1. Experiment that shows delayed determination of photon path

In the two diagrams in Fig. 1, photons are emitted one at a time from a laser symbolized by a yellow star. They pass through a 50% beam splitter (green block) that reflects or transmits 1/2 of the photons. The reflected or transmitted photons travel along two possible paths depicted by the red or blue lines.

In the top diagram, it seems as though the trajectories of the photons are known: If a photon emerges from the top of the apparatus, it seems as though it had to have come by way of the blue path, and if it emerges from the side of the apparatus, it seems as though it had to have come by way of the red path. However, it is important to keep in mind that the photon is in a superposition of the paths until it is detected. The assumption above—that it 'had to have come by way of' either path—is a form of the 'separation fallacy'.

In the bottom diagram, a second beam splitter is introduced at the top right. It recombines the beams corresponding to the red and blue paths. By introducing the second beam splitter, the usual way of thinking is that the path information has been "erased." However, we have to be careful, because the photon cannot be assumed to have 'really' gone along one or the other path. Recombining the beams results in interference phenomena at detection screens positioned just beyond each exit port. What issues to the right side displays reinforcement, and what issues toward the top displays cancellation. It is important to keep in mind however that the illustrated interferometer effects apply only to a single photon in a pure state. When dealing with a pair of entangled photons, the photon encountering the interferometer will be in a mixed state, and there will be no visible interference pattern without coincidence counting to select appropriate subsets of the data.

=== Delayed choice ===
Elementary precursors to current quantum-eraser experiments such as the "simple quantum eraser" described above have straightforward classical-wave explanations. Indeed, it could be argued that there is nothing particularly quantum about this experiment. Nevertheless, Jordan has argued on the basis of the correspondence principle, that despite the existence of classical explanations, first-order interference experiments such as the above can be interpreted as true quantum erasers.

These precursors use single-photon interference. Versions of the quantum eraser using entangled photons, however, are intrinsically non-classical. Because of that, in order to avoid any possible ambiguity concerning the quantum versus classical interpretation, most experimenters have opted to use nonclassical entangled-photon light sources to demonstrate quantum erasers with no classical analog.

Furthermore, the use of entangled photons enables the design and implementation of versions of the quantum eraser that are impossible to achieve with single-photon interference, such as the delayed-choice quantum eraser, which is the topic of this article.

== The experiment of Kim et al. (1999) ==
Figure 2. Setup of the delayed-choice quantum-eraser experiment of Kim et al. Detector D_{0} is movable

The experimental setup, described in detail in Kim et al., is illustrated in Fig 2. An argon laser generates individual 351.1 nm photons that pass through a double-slit apparatus (vertical black line in the upper left corner of the diagram).

An individual photon goes through one (or both) of the two slits. In the illustration, the photon paths are color-coded as red or light blue lines to indicate which slit the photon came through (red indicates slit A, light blue indicates slit B).

So far, the experiment is like a conventional two-slit experiment. However, after the slits, spontaneous parametric down-conversion (SPDC) is used to prepare an entangled two-photon state. This is done by a nonlinear optical crystal BBO (beta barium borate) that converts the photon (from either slit) into two identical, orthogonally polarized entangled photons with 1/2 the frequency of the original photon. The paths followed by these orthogonally polarized photons are caused to diverge by the Glan–Thompson prism.

One of these 702.2 nm photons, referred to as the "signal" photon (look at the red and light-blue lines going upwards from the Glan–Thompson prism) continues to the target detector called D_{0}. During an experiment, detector D_{0} is scanned along its x axis, its motions controlled by a step motor. A plot of "signal" photon counts detected by D_{0} versus x can be examined to discover whether the cumulative signal forms an interference pattern.

The other entangled photon, referred to as the "idler" photon (look at the red and light-blue lines going downwards from the Glan–Thompson prism), is deflected by prism PS that sends it along divergent paths depending on whether it came from slit A or slit B.

Somewhat beyond the path split, the idler photons encounter beam splitters BS_{a}, BS_{b}, and BS_{c} that each have a 50% chance of allowing the idler photon to pass through and a 50% chance of causing it to be reflected. M_{a} and M_{b} are mirrors.

Figure 3. x axis: position of D_{0}. y axis: joint detection rates between D_{0} and D_{1}, D_{2}, D_{3}, D_{4} (R_{01}, R_{02}, R_{03}, R_{04}). R_{04} is not provided in the Kim article and is supplied according to their verbal description.

Figure 4. Simulated recordings of photons jointly detected between D_{0} and D_{1}, D_{2}, D_{3}, D_{4} (R_{01}, R_{02}, R_{03}, R_{04})

The beam splitters and mirrors direct the idler photons towards detectors labeled D_{1}, D_{2}, D_{3} and D_{4}. Note that:

- If an idler photon is recorded at detector D_{3}, it can only have come from slit B.
- If an idler photon is recorded at detector D_{4}, it can only have come from slit A.
- If an idler photon is detected at detector D_{1} or D_{2}, it might have come from slit A or slit B.
- The optical path length measured from slit to D_{1}, D_{2}, D_{3}, and D_{4} is 2.5 m longer than the optical path length from slit to D_{0}. This means that any information that one can learn from an idler photon must be approximately 8 ns later than what one can learn from its entangled signal photon.

Detection of the idler photon by D_{3} or D_{4} provides delayed "which-path information" indicating whether the signal photon with which it is entangled had gone through slit A or B. On the other hand, detection of the idler photon by D_{1} or D_{2} provides a delayed indication that such information is not available for its entangled signal photon. Insofar as which-path information had earlier potentially been available from the idler photon, it is said that the information has been subjected to a "delayed erasure".

By using a coincidence counter, the experimenters were able to isolate the entangled signal from photo-noise, recording only events where both signal and idler photons were detected (after compensating for the 8 ns delay). Refer to Figs 3 and 4.

- When the experimenters looked at the signal photons whose entangled idlers were detected at D_{1} or D_{2}, they detected interference patterns.
- However, when they looked at the signal photons whose entangled idlers were detected at D_{3} or D_{4}, they detected simple diffraction patterns with no interference.

=== Significance ===
This result is similar to that of the double-slit experiment since interference is observed when it is extracted according to phase value (R_{01} or R_{02}). Note that the phase cannot be measured if the photon's path (the slit through which it passes) is known.

Figure 5. Distribution of signal photons at D_{0} can be compared with distribution of bulbs on digital billboard. When all the bulbs are lit, billboard does not reveal any pattern of image, which can be "recovered" only by switching off some bulbs. Likewise interference pattern or no-interference pattern among signal photons at D_{0} can be recovered only after "switching off" (or ignoring) some signal photons and which signal photons should be ignored to recover pattern, this information can be gained only by looking at corresponding entangled idler photons in detectors D_{1} to D_{4}.

However, what makes this experiment possibly astonishing is that, unlike in the classic double-slit experiment, the choice of whether to preserve or erase the which-path information of the idler was not made until 8 ns after the position of the signal photon had already been measured by D_{0}.

Detection of signal photons at D_{0} does not directly yield any which-path information. Detection of idler photons at D_{3} or D_{4}, which provide which-path information, means that no interference pattern can be observed in the jointly detected subset of signal photons at D_{0}. Likewise, detection of idler photons at D_{1} or D_{2}, which do not provide which-path information, means that interference patterns can be observed in the jointly detected subset of signal photons at D_{0}.

In other words, even though an idler photon is not observed until long after its entangled signal photon arrives at D_{0} due to the shorter optical path for the latter, interference at D_{0} is determined by whether a signal photon's entangled idler photon is detected at a detector that preserves its which-path information (D_{3} or D_{4}), or at a detector that erases its which-path information (D_{1} or D_{2}).

Some have interpreted this result to mean that the delayed choice to observe or not observe the path of the idler photon changes the outcome of an event in the past. Note in particular that an interference pattern may only be pulled out for observation after the idlers have been detected (i.e., at D_{1} or D_{2}).

The total pattern of all signal photons at D_{0}, whose entangled idlers went to multiple different detectors, will never show interference regardless of what happens to the idler photons. One can get an idea of how this works by looking at the graphs of R_{01}, R_{02}, R_{03}, and R_{04}, and observing that the peaks of R_{01} line up with the troughs of R_{02} (i.e. a π phase shift exists between the two interference fringes). R_{03} shows a single maximum, and R_{04}, which is experimentally identical to R_{03} will show equivalent results. The entangled photons, as filtered with the help of the coincidence counter, are simulated in Fig. 5 to give a visual impression of the evidence available from the experiment. In D_{0}, the sum of all the correlated counts will not show interference. If all the photons that arrive at D_{0} were to be plotted on one graph, one would see only a bright central band.

== Implications ==
=== Retrocausality ===
Delayed-choice experiments raise questions about the causal connections between the events. If events at D_{1}, D_{2}, D_{3}, D_{4} determine outcomes at D_{0}, then the effects might seem to precede their causes in time.

=== Consensus: no retrocausality ===
However, the interference pattern can only be seen retroactively once the idler photons have been detected and the detection information used to select subsets of signal photons.

Moreover, it is observed that the apparent retroactive action vanishes if the effects of observations on the state of the entangled signal and idler photons are considered in their historic order. Specifically, in the case when detection/deletion of which-way information happens before the detection on D_{0}, the standard simplistic explanation says "The detector D_{i}, at which the idler photon is detected, determines the probability distribution at D_{0} for the signal photon". Similarly, in the case when D_{0} precedes detection of the idler photon, the following description is just as accurate: "The position at D_{0} of the detected signal photon determines the probabilities for the idler photon to hit either of D_{1}, D_{2}, D_{3} or D_{4}". These are just equivalent ways of formulating the correlations of entangled photons' observables in an intuitive causal way, so one may choose any of those (in particular, that one where the cause precedes the consequence and no retrograde action appears in the explanation).

The total pattern of signal photons at the primary detector never shows interference (see Fig. 5), so it is not possible to deduce what will happen to the idler photons by observing the signal photons alone. In a paper by Johannes Fankhauser, it is shown that the delayed choice quantum eraser experiment resembles a Bell-type scenario in which the paradox's resolution is rather trivial, and so there really is no mystery. Moreover, it gives a detailed account of the experiment in the de Broglie-Bohm picture with definite trajectories arriving at the conclusion that there is no "backwards in time influence" present. The delayed-choice quantum eraser does not communicate information in a retro-causal manner because it takes another signal, one which must arrive by a process that can go no faster than the speed of light, to sort the superimposed data in the signal photons into four streams that reflect the states of the idler photons at their four distinct detection screens.

A theorem proven by Phillippe Eberhard shows that if the accepted equations of relativistic quantum field theory are correct, faster than light communications is impossible. (See reference for a treatment emphasizing the role of conditional probabilities.)

== Other delayed-choice quantum-eraser experiments ==
Scarcelli et al. (2007) reported on a delayed-choice quantum-eraser experiment based on a two-photon imaging scheme. After detecting a photon passed through a double-slit, a random delayed choice was made to erase or not erase the which-path information by the measurement of its distant entangled twin; the particle-like and wave-like behavior of the photon were then recorded simultaneously and respectively by only one set of joint detectors.

Peruzzo et al. (2012) have reported on a quantum delayed-choice experiment based on a quantum-controlled beam splitter, in which particle and wave behaviors were investigated simultaneously. The quantum nature of the photon's behavior was tested with a Bell inequality, which replaced the delayed choice of the observer.

Rezai et al. (2018) have combined the Hong-Ou-Mandel interference with a delayed choice quantum eraser. They impose two incompatible photons onto a beam-splitter, such that no interference pattern could be observed. When the output ports are monitored in an integrated fashion (i.e. counting all the clicks), no interference occurs. Only when the outcoming photons are polarization analysed and the right subset is selected, quantum interference in the form of a Hong-Ou-Mandel dip occurs.

The construction of solid-state electronic Mach–Zehnder interferometers (MZI) has led to proposals to use them in electronic versions of quantum-eraser experiments. This would be achieved by Coulomb coupling to a second electronic MZI acting as a detector.

Entangled pairs of neutral kaons have also been examined and found suitable for investigations using quantum marking and quantum-erasure techniques.

A quantum eraser has been proposed using a modified Stern-Gerlach setup. In this proposal, no coincident counting is required, and quantum erasure is accomplished by applying an additional Stern-Gerlach magnetic field.
