= Coincidence counting (physics) =

In quantum physics, coincidence counting is used in experiments testing particle non-locality and quantum entanglement. In these experiments two or more particles are created from the same initial packet of energy, inexorably linking/entangling their physical properties. Separate particle detectors measure the quantum states of each particle and send the resulting signal to a coincidence counter. In any experiment studying entanglement, the entangled particles are vastly outnumbered by non-entangled particles which are also detected; patternless noise that drowns out the entangled signal. In a two detector system, a coincidence counter alleviates this problem by only recording detection signals that strike both detectors simultaneously (or more accurately, recording only signals that arrive at both detectors and correlate to the same emission time). This ensures that the data represents only entangled particles.

However, since no detector/counter circuit has infinitely precise temporal resolution (due both to limitations in the electronics and the laws of the Universe itself), detections must be sorted into time bins (detection windows equivalent to the temporal resolution of the system). Detections in the same bin appear to occur at the same time because their individual detection times cannot be resolved any further. Thus in a two detector system, two unrelated, non-entangled particles may randomly strike both detectors, get sorted into the same time bin, and create a false-coincidence that adds noise to the signal. This limits coincidence counters to improving the signal-to-noise ratio to the extent that the quantum behavior can be studied, without removing the noise completely.

== History ==
As of 1951, coincidence counting was described as "an important tool in experimental physics for a long time." In 1955, a seminal paper from the University of Glasgow suggested using "the coincidence counting technique of nuclear physics to measure the lifetime of excited atomic states."

Every experiment to date that has been used to calculate Bell's inequalities, perform a quantum eraser, or conduct any experiment utilizing quantum entanglement as an information channel has only been possible through the use of coincidence counters. This unavoidably prevents superluminal communication since, even if a random or purposeful decision appears to be affecting events that have already transpired (as in the delayed choice quantum eraser), the signal from the past cannot be seen/decoded until the coincidence circuit has correlated both the past and future behavior. Thus the "signal" in the past is only visible after it is "sent" from the future, precluding quantum entanglement from being exploited for the purposes of faster-than-light communication or data time travel.

== See also ==
- Non-linear optics
- Delayed choice quantum eraser
