= Cheuk-Yin Wong =

- Born: 1941 (age 84–85); China
- Citizenship: United States
- Education: Princeton University
- Awards: APS Fellow
- Scientific career
- Fields: Nuclear physics
- Workplaces: Oak Ridge National Laboratory
- Doctoral advisor: John Archibald Wheeler

Cheuk-Yin Wong (born 1941) is a theoretical nuclear physicist at Oak Ridge National Laboratory.

Wong was born in China in 1941 and grew up in Hong Kong. He received his bachelor's degree in physics from Princeton University in 1961, followed by his M.A. in 1963 and PhD in Theoretical Physics in 1966 also from Princeton, where his thesis advisor was John Archibald Wheeler. Wong has worked at the Oak Ridge National Laboratory since 1966 and has held visiting positions at the Niels Bohr Institute (1968-1969), Massachusetts Institute of Technology (1982-1983), and the University of Tokyo (1988).

In 1978 Wong was made a fellow of the American Physical Society (APS) under their Division of Nuclear Physics Fellowship. He served as vice-chairman between 1997-1998 and chairman between 1999-2000 of the Overseas Chinese Physics Association (OCPA). Wong was an editor of the journals Chinese Physics from 1983-1989 and International Journal of Modern Physics E from 1998-2004. He is the author of the 1994 textbook Introduction to High-Energy Heavy-Ion Collisions and, as of 2026, has over 200 scientific articles associated with his ORCID profile.

== Published Works ==
- Cheuk-Yin Wong, (1994). Introduction to High-Energy Heavy-Ion Collisions, World Scientific Pub Co Inc. ISBN 981-02-0263-6
