= The Princeton Three =

The Princeton Three was a group of two physicists and a political economist working at the Princeton University during the Cold War Era. Of the three men Eugene Wigner and John Archibald Wheeler studied physics and Oskar Morgenstern studied political economy. Their main goal was to establish a national science laboratory in the United States of America that would help America catch the Soviet Union in the Intermediate range ballistic missile (IRBM) race, as well as push the United States ahead in the space race. The basic outline of this laboratory called for university scientists to have complete and open insight to the militaristic needs if the country in order to spend some two or three years working full-time, without the shackles of administrative bodies or security restrictions. They would use their specific field of study to improve the defense systems of the military and other important project deemed necessary.

== Before Sputnik ==
In 1949 the Department of Defense (DOD) established the Weapons Systems Evaluation Group (WSEG). It was established to conduct research for the DOD and the Joint Chiefs of Staff. However, due to the civil service system jobs with the WSEG were low paying and offered low amounts of prestige in the scientific community. To combat this, on May 4, 1955, Secretary of Defense Charles E. Wilson wrote to the president of the Massachusetts Institute of Technology (MIT), James Killian, about an interim contract between MIT and the DOD that would allow MIT to oversee WSEG's operations, therefore bringing more prestige and money to the job. On top of this the letter also contained information about the formation of an association of university so that MIT was not burdened with sole responsibility for the contract and facilities and services provided for WSEG. With MIT involved people could be hired, as civilian scientists, through the university allowing for much more prestige and better salaries. After the university was on board talks began with other highly touted universities such as the California Institute of Technology (Caltech), Case Institute of Technology, Stanford and Tulane all of which agreed to join the cause, they established a non-profit corporation to conduct the work under. The name of the corporation was The Institute for Defense Analyses (IDA) and was incorporated under MIT on April 4, 1956 and the other universities joined September 1. General James McCormack was named President of the IDA. McCormack had some ideas for the corporation that would advance scientific academics in the United States, IDA was given a $500,000 grant from the Ford Foundation that was to be used to help get the group up and running and once they could sustain themselves they were to put it toward university research programs that aided national defense and operations research.

== Response to Sputnik ==
October 4, 1957 the Soviet Union put the first satellite into orbit around the Earth. Sputnik one caused many in the U.S. scientific community to outburst on the lack of work put into a satellite program. One of the key contributors to these outbursts was a former German scientist, turned American through project paperclip, Wernher von Braun. Von Braun stated that if given the correct materials and the go ahead he would have an American satellite in orbit in a matter of months, and he did not disappoint. January 31, 1958, two months after the Soviets launch their second satellite, Sputnik II, into orbit Explorer I, the first American satellite, was launched into orbit. The Soviets launch of Sputnik I and Sputnik II showed that America was falling behind in fall facets of scientific research only adding to the need of a national laboratory set aside for scientific research according to the issues present.

== The rise of the national lab idea ==
The man who got the ball rolling on the entire idea of the national laboratory was Princeton University professor John Archibald Wheeler. Post World War II Wheeler was a key contributor to the creation of the hydrogen bomb. After his time in Los Alamos National Laboratory he returned to Princeton and set up Project Matterhorn B where he could work on military projects while still being able to be at Princeton. Wheeler was discouraged with the amount of physicists wanting to work in the theoretical field, he believed physicists should remain working in the field of "primordial design", meaning that physicists should want to discover new things, fidget with gadgets and research instead of sticking with the new form of strategists planning out new ways to use technology already in play. His goal of a national laboratory would take a long time to play out but through the help of some key players like Senator Henry Jackson, University of California, Berkeley professor Edward Teller and John Kenneth Mansfield the idea had its roots in the formation of an advisory committee for the North Atlantic Treaty Organization (NATO) that would lead to main ideas of an American national laboratory.

== Wheeler's proposal ==
After his work on the NATO committee Wheeler had the idea that the United States should do something similar but on a much bigger scale. In October 1957 Wheeler wrote to William E. Wright, who was head of the Nuclear Physics Division of the Office of Naval Research (ONR) about the idea of a national laboratory based on the structure and style of the NATO committee. On that same day Wheeler was proposed an idea that would help scientific education in the United States. Dorothy Fosdick visited Wheeler to discuss a $5,000 four-year scholarship for 400,000 graduating high school seniors, he pitched this as an idea that would be a $2 billion a year boost to help national defense. Looking at the numbers after the grant went into play in 1957 and 1958 1.5 million students graduated high school, one in two attended college where one in fifty received a bachelor's degree in physical science. While these numbers seemed amazing and that the grant was doing great things for the field of science what wheeler noticed is that not much was actually getting done other than teaching a new era of people about the current scientific world. He decided that the best way to counter the threat of the Soviet Union was not a crash course on education but instead he proposed a new Advanced Research Projects Agency. He contacted the likes of Killian and other members of the President's Science Advisory Committee (PSAC).

Wheeler believed with would help bring about planning and priority to national defense and the new ideas that began to come about. Since he had been a professor and saw first hand the work that gets done when people are in a setting where they can work together while still having private space to conduct research, he was sure that the way to make the idea of a national laboratory would be to make a campus-like setting for all the invited scientists to collaborate and work on defense and national security. Wheeler wanted a national laboratory much like the government created for bomb testing at Los Alamos during World War II. A former colleague wrote to Wheeler, a physicist named Kenneth Watson, about the current state of defense research and it was rather disappointing. Many of the researchers and workers around the job sites spent much of their time talking about how glad they were they didn't have to do too much work and that defense agencies spend a majority of their time discussing how good of a job they are doing in certain areas rather than actually doing those jobs.

While Wheeler was spreading this new idea of the national laboratory he gained the attention of two co-workers who would later make up the Princeton Three. On January 2, 1958 Wheeler sat down with the Dean of Princeton faculty, James D. Brown, Eugene Wigner, Oskar Morgenstern and a couple other Princeton faculty to discuss the possibility of the lab. And although his two counterparts loved the idea and may have been thinking bout it before approached by Wheeler both Wigner and Morgenstern gave full credit throughout the process to Wheeler. The three sent their first proposal to IDA was denied with a response that said while they agree defense is necessary and scientists need to be employed by the government, they were concerned that pulling too many top scientists out of universities would lower the education level of incoming scientists. Wheeler read the response and edited his proposal for a second attempt.

== Second proposal ==
After the first proposal was shut down Wheeler got to work on revising his first attempt and making it better. This second attempt was sent in on January 9, 1958. During the early part of 1958 the President Eisenhower attempted to make changes in the defense budget allotting more money to the DOD to put toward national security and missile defense. The new budget called for an estimated total of $39.8 billion going toward national defense, an increase of almost $4 million than congress allotted previously for the effort. Wheeler attempted to use this to his advantage, he requested, in his second proposal, that the DOD use that money to model the research and development sector after the Du Pont R&D lab. A version of his proposal made it into the New York Times article written about Eisenhower's budget change idea, but was eventually denied by President Stern of the IDA. He claimed that there was no need for so much defense effort during a time of peace.

== Death of the Idea ==
Wheeler sent out a third proposal that would also eventually be shut down thus ending the hopes he had of the national defense laboratory. The Princeton three made strides in pushing for a national defense laboratory, but after the dust settled Wheeler's idea was shut down and the idea of the lab slowly declined into nothing.
