= Edwin F. Taylor =

American physicist (1931–2025)

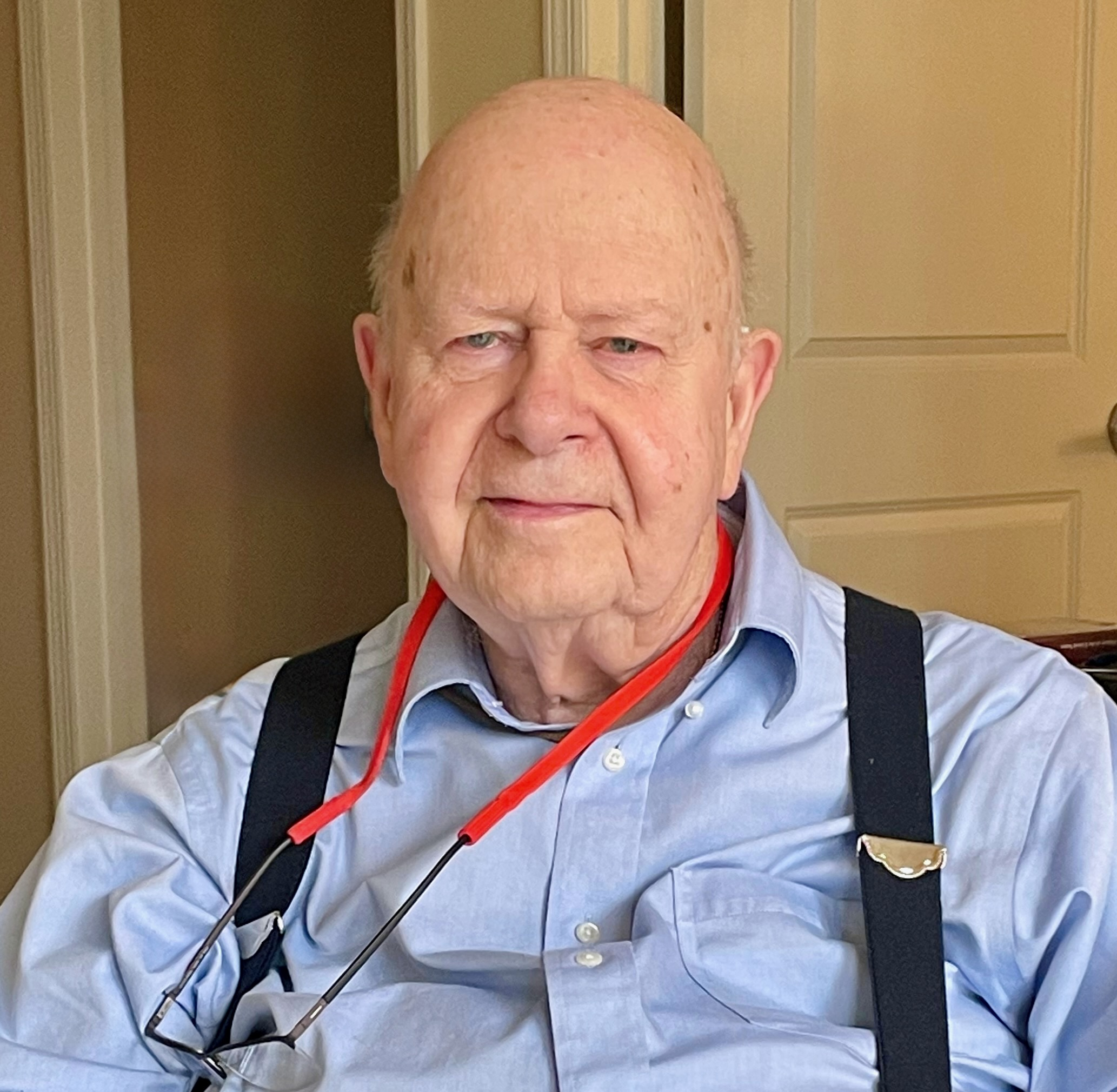
- Taylor in 2022
- Born: June 22, 1931; Oberlin, Ohio, U.S.
- Died: April 25, 2025 (aged 93); Concord, Massachusetts, U.S.
- Awards: Oersted Medal (1998)
- Scientific career
- Fields: Physics Education
- Workplaces: Wesleyan University; Massachusetts Institute of Technology; Boston University; Carnegie Mellon University
- Doctoral advisor: Nicolaas Bloembergen
- Website: eftaylor.com

Edwin Floriman Taylor (June 22, 1931 – April 22, 2025) was an American physicist known for his contributions to the teaching of physics. Taylor was editor of the American Journal of Physics, and author of several introductory books to physics. In 1998 he was awarded the Oersted Medal for his contributions to the teaching of physics.

== Background ==
Edwin Floriman Taylor was born in Oberlin, Ohio, on June 22, 1931, and was the son of Lloyd William Taylor, chairman of the Oberlin College physics department from 1924 to 1948, and Esther Bliss Taylor.

Taylor completed an A.B. degree at Oberlin College in 1953 and obtained first a master (1954) and later a Ph.D. (1958) in physics at Harvard University, where his advisor was Nicolaas Bloembergen.

Taylor died on April 22, 2025, at the age of 93.

== Career ==
After employment at Wesleyan University as an assistant professor of physics, Taylor moved to the Education Research Center at the Massachusetts Institute of Technology, where Taylor he remained for 25 years, first as a Visiting Associate Professor and later as a senior research scientist.

After retiring from MIT in 1991, Taylor went on to positions first at Boston University and then at Carnegie Mellon University. He served as editor of the American Journal of Physics from 1973 to 1978.

== Research and teaching ==
Taylor’s primary research interests are in the field of physics education. One of his areas of activity was curriculum development: he was part of the team gathered by Jerrold Zacharias to develop a new undergraduate physics course at MIT, was a member of the steering committee of the Introductory University Physics Project (IUPP) for several years, and was involved in developing high school physics curricula at Boston University.

Through his physics text books, Taylor became known to a wider academic audience. During a Junior Faculty Sabbatical at Wesleyan University, which Taylor spent at Princeton University, he collaborated with the relativist John Archibald Wheeler on an introductory text on special relativity, which began with Wheeler's relativity lectures to an honors physics freshman class, which Taylor transcribed, and evolved into an intense collaboration that resulted in the book Spacetime Physics, published in 1965.

Taylor and Wheeler later resumed their collaboration to produce an introduction to general relativity, published in 2000 as Exploring Black Holes. The book presents fundamental ideas from the theory, using no more than basic differential and integral calculus. Specific aspects of relativity are explored in "project" chapters interspersed throughout the main text.

Together with the British physicist and physics educator Anthony French, Taylor wrote the undergraduate text book An Introduction to Quantum Physics, first published in 1978.

Taylor was also a pioneer in using both computers in general and the internet in particular as teaching tools. To this end, he co-developed software designed to help students understand the geometry and the effects of special relativity, and taught an early online course offered by Montana State University.

In 1998, Taylor received the Oersted Medal from the "For his profound contributions to the pedagogy of relativity and quantum mechanics, his service to the physics community as editor of the American Journal of Physics, and his pioneering efforts in the development of software for relativity, quantum mechanics, and Internet teaching."

A full, free download of the second edition of Taylor and Wheeler's special relativity text is available at spacetimephysics.org. A second edition of the general relativity text was prepared with Edmund Bertschinger, and is available only in online form for full and free download at exploringblackholes.org.

== Bibliography ==
- Edwin F. Taylor, Introductory Mechanics. John Wiley & Sons Inc (1963).
- Edwin F. Taylor, Notes on Introductory Relativity (1963).
- Edwin F. Taylor and John Archibald Wheeler, Spacetime Physics, New York, W. H. Freeman and Co., Second edition (1992). Full and free download available at spacetimephysics.org.
- Edwin F. Taylor and John Archibald Wheeler, Exploring Black Holes: Introduction to General Relativity, Addison Wesley Longman (2000). Full and free download available at exploringblackholes.org.
- Edwin F. Taylor and John Archibald Wheeler, Scouting black holes: Exploring general relativity with calculus
- Edwin F. Taylor, Desmystifying Quantum Mechanics.
- Anthony P. French and Edwin F. Taylor, An Introduction to Quantum Physics (MIT Introductory Physics Series, 1978).
- Edwin F. Taylor, Go critical: A retrospective study of the MIT Education Research Center, 1960-1973.
