= Kenneth W. Ford =

American physicist (1926–2025)

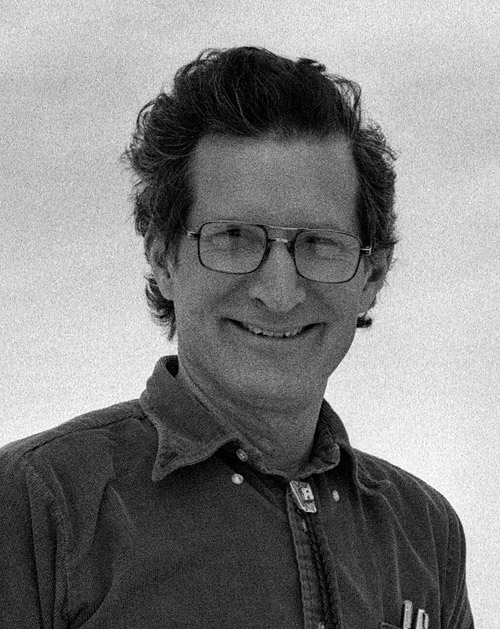
- Ford in 1978
- Born: Kenneth William Ford; May 1, 1926; West Palm Beach, Florida, U.S.
- Died: December 5, 2025 (aged 99)
- Education: Harvard University (A.B.); Princeton University (Ph.D.)
- Known for: Project Matterhorn, various textbooks on physics
- Spouse: Joanne Baumunk Ford
- Children: Paul Ford; Sarah Ford; Nina Tannenwald; Caroline Richards; Adam Ford; Jason Ford; Star Ford
- Scientific career
- Fields: Physics
- Doctoral advisor: John Archibald Wheeler

Kenneth William Ford (May 1, 1926 – December 5, 2025) was an American theoretical physicist, teacher, and writer, residing near Philadelphia, Pennsylvania. He was the first chair of the physics department at the University of California, Irvine, and later served as president of the New Mexico Institute of Mining and Technology (New Mexico Tech) and as Executive Director and CEO of the American Institute of Physics.

== Early life and education ==
Ford was born on May 1, 1926, in West Palm Beach, Florida, to parents Paul Hammond Ford (1892–1961) and Edith Timblin Ford (1892–1992) and was the second of their three children. He spent most of his childhood in Kentucky, living one year in Georgia when he was eight and nine.

He attended Highlands High School in Fort Thomas, Kentucky, from 1940 to 1942, then Phillips Exeter Academy in Exeter, NH, graduating in 1944. In 1948, he received an A.B. from Harvard University, graduating summa cum laude. He received his Ph.D. in physics from Princeton University in 1953, studying under John Archibald Wheeler. During 1950-1952 he interrupted his graduate studies to join the H-bomb design team at Los Alamos National Laboratory (then Los Alamos Scientific Laboratory) and at Princeton University's Project Matterhorn.

== US Navy ==
In April 1944, just before his 18th birthday, while still at Exeter, Ford enlisted in the US Navy. After summer employment at the Marine Biological Laboratory in Woods Hole, Massachusetts, Ford was called to active service and began the Navy's Electronic Technician Training. In June 1945, he transferred into the V-12 Navy College Training Program, studying at John Carroll University in Cleveland, Ohio, and at the University of Michigan in Ann Arbor. In three four-month semesters completed in one year, he was able to secure credit for two years of college work and entered Harvard University as a junior in the fall of 1946 following his discharge from the Navy in June of that year.

== Graduate work and the H-bomb ==
In the fall of 1948, Ford began graduate studies in physics at Princeton University. In 1950, he took a leave of absence from graduate work to work on the H-bomb at Los Alamos National Laboratory (then called the Los Alamos Scientific Laboratory) with his mentor John Wheeler. Others in Wheeler's immediate group were John Toll and Burton Freeman. They worked closely with other lab staff members such as Carson Mark, Conrad Longmire, Edward Teller, and Stanislaw Ulam, and with lab consultants such as John von Neumann, Enrico Fermi, and Hans Bethe. Following the radiation implosion idea offered by Teller and Ulam early in 1951, the focus of the work was on this new design idea. In June 1951, Ford returned to Princeton to continue the H-bomb work there at Wheeler's Project Matterhorn.

Much of Ford's work was concerned with writing programs and doing calculations related to thermonuclear burning, first using human "computers" with desk calculators, then IBM card-programmed calculators (CPCs), and later, with Project Matterhorn, the SEAC computer at the National Bureau of Standards in Washington, D.C. A SEAC calculation, programmed by Ford with the assistance of John Toll and the guidance of John Wheeler, provided the final predicted yield of 7 megatons for the Mike test on November 1, 1952. The actual yield was approximately 10 megatons.

"I was aware of the fact that Oppenheimer was expressing opposition to the development of the H-bomb, for various reasons, from technical to moral. But I was also an accidental participant in what may have been the critical moment in changing his point of view. In June of '51 there was a meeting of the General Advisory Committee of the Atomic Energy Commission [actually a broader gathering that included the GAC] meeting at the Institute for Advanced Study. They were meeting in a first floor room on, if I remember correctly, a Sunday morning. Maybe it was a Saturday morning. It was a weekend. [It was Sunday, June 17.] Wheeler was scheduled to make a presentation on the latest results of our calculations on the CPC in New York. I was working every night, all night, that week prior to that meeting trying to get the latest and best results that we could.

"The night prior to this meeting at the Institute for Advanced Study, I took a morning train down from New York with the latest results, went over to the Matterhorn building, got out a very large piece of paper, maybe about two feet by three feet in size, a large rectangle of paper, and sketched out a graph showing our latest calculation of thermonuclear burning, still very crude of course, because of those calculations, yet extremely encouraging. I then rolled up this large graph and drove over to the Institute and walked up to the first-floor window of the room where the meeting was in progress and either rapped gently on the window or signaled through the window to catch Wheeler's attention. As it happened, Wheeler had just taken the floor. It had just become his turn to speak. He interrupted his speech, walked over to the window, opened it, took from me this large graph, carried it back and pasted it on the blackboard for all to see. And then, at that moment, according to the reports of those who were there, Oppenheimer suddenly decided, 'This does look encouraging. I think they've really got something. It looks like it's going to work after all.'"

In the fall of 1952, Ford left project Matterhorn and spent the next six months completing his graduate dissertation on the collective model of the nucleus. After defending his dissertation in the spring of 1953, and after spending that summer working in Los Alamos, he took up a post-doctoral research appointment at Indiana University, beginning that fall.

Ford furthered his professional education in two subsequent leaves of absence: in 1955–56 at the Max Planck Institut in Göttingen, Germany, mentored by Werner Heisenberg and supported by a Fulbright Fellowship; and in 1961–62 at Imperial College, London and MIT in Cambridge, Massachusetts, mentored by Abdus Salam, Herman Feshbach, and Victor Weisskopf and supported by a National Science Foundation Senior Postdoctoral Fellowship. It was during this second leave that Ford wrote his first book, The World of Elementary Particles.

In 1964, Ford took a job as professor and department chair at the newly opened University of California, Irvine, setting up the physics department there for its opening in the fall of 1965.

== Cessation of weapons work ==
In the summer of 1968, influenced by his opposition to the Vietnam War, Ford announced at a talk in Cloudcroft, NM that he would no longer do weapons work or other secret work.

== Research, Teaching, Administration and Writing ==
Ford's principal research was in the theory of nuclear structure, with some work in particle and mathematical physics. He exploited the nuclear shell model and the collective, or unified, model, and also worked extensively on muonic atoms. His first paper, co-authored with David Bohm in 1950, used data from low-energy neutron scattering to give evidence for the transparency of nuclei to neutrons. A 1953 paper showed how regularities in the energies of the first excited states of even-even nuclei can be interpreted in terms of the deformations of these nuclei. Later papers analyzed muonic-atom data to give evidence on the distribution of electric charge within nuclei. Ford's 1959 papers with John Wheeler provided a semiclassical theory of scattering. In 1963, he participated, with Henry Kolm and Eiichi Goto, in a search for magnetic monopoles.

Although Ford's initial appointment at Indiana University in 1953 was as a postdoctoral researcher, he was given the opportunity to teach a graduate course. In later appointments at Indiana and other universities, he continued to teach both graduate students and undergraduate. Subsequent to retirement, he taught high-school physics at Germantown Academy (1995–98) and at Germantown Friends School (2000-2001).

In 1958, after a year's leave from Indiana University in Los Alamos, Ford took up new faculty duties at Brandeis University, where he continued research, supervision of graduate students, and, for the first time, taught introductory physics. He also served as department chair at Brandeis, 1963–64. In 1964, he was recruited by the soon-to-open new campus of the University of California at Irvine as its first physics chair. he was instrumental in recruiting future Nobel Prize laureate Frederick Reines to the faculty at Irvine.

In 1970, for family reasons, Ford left Irvine for the University of Massachusetts Boston, where he was a professor. In 1975, he accepted the job of president of the New Mexico Institute of Mining and Technology (NM Tech). He spent 7 years at New Mexico Tech, resigning after receiving a vote of no confidence from the faculty. Ford then became executive vice president of the University of Maryland System. That job lasted for slightly more than a year, during 1982–83, before Ford took his first non-academic job as president of Molecular Biophysics Technology in Philadelphia.

When Molecular Physics of Technology's research results failed to measure up to expectations and the company had to shut down, Ford took a position as education officer of the American Physical Society. Then, in 1987, he became the director of the American Institute of Physics and later helped to shepherd its move from New York City (to which he'd been commuting from Philadelphia) to College Park, MD. Ford's retirement from the institute in 1993, at age 67, coincided with its move to College Park, along with other physics organizations.

Ford wrote eleven books (counting one three-volume work as three books), one of them with a co-author—five before his retirement and six after. His first book, The World of Elementary Particles, written in 1961-62 and published in 1963, did well enough and was satisfying enough to encourage him to write more. The thick textbook Basic Physics followed in 1968 and the three volumes of Classical and Modern Physics in 1972–74. Following his retirement and while teaching at Germantown Academy, he joined with John Wheeler to write Wheeler's autobiography, Geons, Black Holes, and Quantum Foam, published in 1998. In 1999, this book won an American Institute of Physics Science Writing Prize. There followed The Quantum World in 2004, In Love with Flying (a memoir) in 2007, 101 Quantum Questions in 2011, and Building the H Bomb in 2015. Basic Physics was reissued in 2017, repurposed as a resource for teachers. In 2021, he published a second memoir, The First 95 Years, which was a collection of short essays about a variety of things in his life.

== Issues with secrecy ==
While in the final stages of writing his book Building the H Bomb, Ford was asked by the United States Department of Energy to excise approximately ten percent of his manuscript as the security officials at DOE felt that it had the potential to reveal decades-old government classified information. After some back-and-forth, Ford made minimal edits to the book and went ahead with publishing, putting himself at risk of prosecution, but no action was taken by the DOE.

== Post-retirement ==
After officially retiring, Ford conducted some consulting work, worked for the David and Lucile Packard Foundation, tutored students, both in person and online, taught high-school physics, and, as noted above, wrote six books. He lived outside Philadelphia.

== Personal life and death ==
Ford married Karin Stehnike on August 27, 1953, and fathered two children; Paul Thomas Ford (born 1957) and Sarah Elizabeth Ford (born 1958). They divorced in 1961.

He married Joanne Baumunk on June 9, 1962, gained one stepdaughter, Nina Tannenwald (born 1959), and fathered four more children: Caroline Amanda Ford (now Caroline Richards; born 1963), Adam Baumunk Ford (born 1964), Jason Lawrence Ford (born 1966), and Lucas Wheeler (now Star Lucia Ford; born 1968). He had 13 grandchildren and three step-grandchildren. Ken and Joanne celebrated 60 years of marriage in June 2022, before Joanne’s death on September 5, 2022.

Ford died on December 5, 2025, at the age of 99.

== Selected honors ==
- 1944 Westinghouse Science Talent Search winner
- 1944 Prize for General Excellence, Phillips Exeter Academy
- 1948 Phi Beta Kappa, Sigma Xi, Harvard College
- 1955–56 Fulbright Fellow, Max Planck Institut, Göttingen, Germany
- 1961–62 National Science Foundation (NSF) Senior Postdoctoral Fellow, Imperial College, London, and M.I.T.
- 1976 Distinguished Service Citation, American Association of Physics Teachers
- 2006 Oersted Medal, American Association of Physics Teachers
- Fellow, American Physical Society, American Association for the Advancement of Science, and American Association of Physics Teachers

== Selected bibliography ==
- The World of Elementary Particles (Blaisdell Publishing Co., 1963). Translated into Italian, German, and Russian. (Library of Science selection in the United States, science writing prize in Italy.)
- Basic Physics (Blaisdell, 1968). Introductory text for nonscience students. (Re-released, repurposed to serve as a resource for physics teachers, by World Scientific in 2017.)
- Classical and Modern Physics (Xerox College Publishing, 1972–74). Introductory text for students of science and engineering. 3 volumes.
- Geons, Black Holes, and Quantum Foam: A Life in Physics, with John Archibald Wheeler (W. W. Norton, 1998). Wheeler's autobiography. Translated into Chinese and Greek. (1999 American Institute of Physics Science Writing Prize.)
- The Quantum World: Quantum Physics for Everyone (Harvard University Press, 2004). Translated into several languages. Paperback with “Quantum Questions,” 2005. Answer Manual available.
- In Love With Flying (H Bar Press, 2007). Memoir on 50 years of flying small planes and gliders.
- 101 Quantum Questions: What You Need to Know About the World You Can’t See (Harvard University Press, 2011). Translated into several languages.
- Building the H Bomb: A Personal History (World Scientific, 2015).
- The First 95 Years (H Bar Press, 2021).
