= One-electron universe =

Postulate in particle physics

The one-electron universe is the hypothesis that all electrons and positrons are actually manifestations of a single entity moving backwards and forwards in time. It was proposed by theoretical physicist John Wheeler in a telephone call to Richard Feynman in the spring of 1940. A similar "zigzag world line description of pair annihilation" was independently devised by E. C. G. Stueckelberg at the same time.

== Overview ==
The idea is based on the world lines traced out across spacetime by every electron. Rather than have myriad such lines, Wheeler suggested that they could all be parts of one single line like a huge tangled knot, traced out by the one electron. Any given moment in time is represented by a slice across spacetime, and would meet the knotted line a great many times. Each such meeting point represents a real electron at that moment.

At those points, half the lines will be directed forward in time and half will have looped round and be directed backwards. Wheeler suggested that these backwards sections appeared as the antiparticle to the electron, the positron.

Many more electrons have been observed than positrons, and electrons are thought to comfortably outnumber them. According to Feynman he raised this issue with Wheeler, who speculated that the missing positrons might be hidden within protons.

Feynman was struck by Wheeler's insight that antiparticles could be represented by reversed world lines, and credits this to Wheeler, saying in his Nobel speech:

I received a telephone call one day at the graduate college at Princeton from Professor Wheeler, in which he said, "Feynman, I know why all electrons have the same charge and the same mass" "Why?" "Because, they are all the same electron!" (...) I did not take the idea that all the electrons were the same one from [Wheeler] as seriously as I took the observation that positrons could simply be represented as electrons going from the future to the past in a back section of their world lines. That, I stole!

Feynman later proposed this interpretation of the positron as an electron moving backward in time in his 1949 paper "The Theory of Positrons". Yoichiro Nambu later applied it to all production and annihilation of particle–antiparticle pairs, stating that "the eventual creation and annihilation of pairs that may occur now and then, is no creation nor annihilation, but only a change of directions of moving particles, from past to future, or from future to past."

== See also ==
- CPT symmetry – Invariance under simultaneous charge conjugation, parity transformation and time reversal
- Identical particle – Concept in quantum mechanics of perfectly substitutable particles
- Eddington number – Number of protons in the observable universe
- Retrocausality – Mathematical technique in physics
