= Wheeler's delayed-choice experiment =

Quantum physics thought experiment

Wheeler's delayed-choice experiment describes a family of thought experiments in quantum physics proposed by John Archibald Wheeler, with the most prominent among them appearing in 1978 and 1984. These experiments illustrate the central point of quantum theory: "It is wrong to attribute a tangibility to the photon in all its travel from the point of entry to its last instant of flight."

These experiments close a loophole in the traditional double-slit experiment demonstration that quantum behavior depends on the experimental arrangement. The experiment closes the loophole that a photon might adjust its behavior from particle to wave behavior or vice versa. By altering the apparatus after the photon is supposed to be in "flight", the loophole is closed.

Cosmic versions of the delayed-choice experiment use photons emitted billions of years ago; the results are unchanged. The concept of delayed choice has been productive of many revealing experiments. New versions of the delayed choice concept use quantum effects to control the "choices", leading to the delayed-choice quantum eraser.

== Concept ==
Wheeler's delayed-choice experiment demonstrates that no particle-propagation model consistent with relativity explains quantum theory. Like the double-slit experiment, Wheeler's concept has two equivalent paths between a source and detector. Like the which-way versions of the double-slit, the experiment is run in two versions: one designed to detect wave interference and one designed to detect particles. The new ingredient in Wheeler's approach is a delayed-choice between these two experiments. The decision to measure wave interference or particle path is delayed until just before the detection. The goal is to ensure that any traveling particle or wave will have passed the area of two distinct paths in the quantum system before the choice of experiment is made.

== Cosmic interferometer ==
Wheeler's cosmic interferometer uses a distant quasar with two paths to equipment on Earth, one direct and one by gravitational lensing.

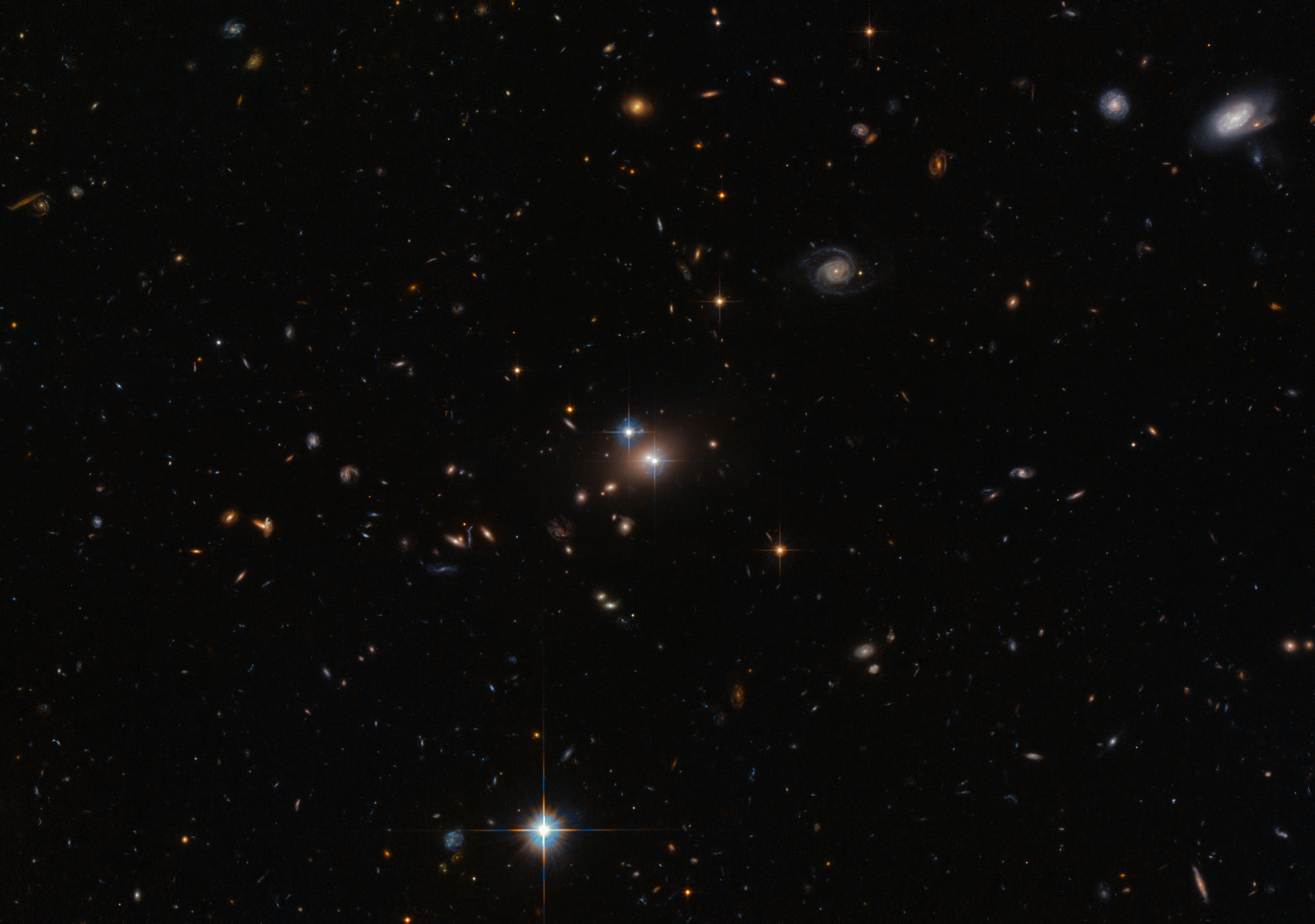
The Twin Quasar shown in the center of this image, is one star almost 9 billion light-years from Earth that produces two images, a result of gravitational lensing.

Wheeler's cosmic scale thought experiment employs a quasar or other light source in a galaxy billions of light years away. Some of these stars are known to be located behind a massive galaxy that acts as a gravitational lens, bending light rays pointing away from Earth back towards us. The result is two images of the star, one direct and one bent. Wheeler proposed to measure the interference between these two paths. Because the light observed in such an experiment was emitted and passed through the lens billions of years ago, no choice on Earth could alter the outcome of the experiment.

Wheeler then plays the devil's advocate and suggests that perhaps for those experimental results to be obtained would mean that at the instant astronomers inserted their beam-splitter, photons that had left the quasar some millions of years ago retroactively decided to travel as waves, and that when the astronomers decided to pull their beam splitter out again that decision was telegraphed back through time to photons that were leaving some millions of years plus some minutes in the past, so that photons retroactively decided to travel as particles.

Several ways of implementing Wheeler's basic idea have been made into real experiments and they support the conclusion that Wheeler anticipated — that what is done at the exit port of the experimental device before the photon is detected will determine whether it displays interference phenomena or not.

== Double-slit version ==
Wheeler's double-slit apparatus.

A second kind of experiment resembles the ordinary double-slit experiment. The schematic diagram of this experiment shows that a lens on the far side of the double slits makes the path from each slit diverge slightly from the other after they cross each other fairly near to that lens. The result is that the two wavefunctions for each photon will be in superposition within a fairly short distance from the double slits, and if a detection screen is provided within the region wherein the wavefunctions are in superposition then interference patterns will be seen. There is no way by which any given photon could have been determined to have arrived from one or the other of the double slits. However, if the detection screen is removed the wavefunctions on each path will superimpose on regions of lower and lower amplitudes, and their combined probability values will be much less than the unreinforced probability values at the center of each path. When telescopes are aimed to intercept the center of the two paths, there will be equal probabilities of nearly 50% that a photon will show up in one of them. When a photon is detected by telescope 1, researchers may associate that photon with the wavefunction that emerged from the lower slit. When one is detected in telescope 2, researchers may associate that photon with the wavefunction that emerged from the upper slit. The explanation that supports this interpretation of experimental results is that a photon has emerged from one of the slits, and that is the end of the matter. A photon must have started at the laser, passed through one of the slits, and arrived by a single straight-line path at the corresponding telescope.

The retrocausal explanation, which Wheeler does not accept, says that with the detection screen in place, interference must be manifested. For interference to be manifested, a light wave must have emerged from each of the two slits. Therefore, a single photon upon coming into the double-slit diaphragm must have "decided" that it needs to go through both slits to be able to interfere with itself on the detection screen. For no interference to be manifested, a single photon coming into the double-slit diaphragm must have "decided" to go by only one slit because that would make it show up at the camera in the appropriate single telescope.

In this thought experiment the telescopes are always present, but the experiment can start with the detection screen being present but then being removed just after the photon leaves the double-slit diaphragm, or the experiment can start with the detection screen being absent and then being inserted just after the photon leaves the diaphragm. Some theorists argue that inserting or removing the screen in the midst of the experiment can force a photon to retroactively decide to go through the double-slits as a particle when it had previously transited it as a wave, or vice versa. Wheeler does not accept this interpretation.

The double slit experiment, like the other six idealized experiments (microscope, split beam, tilt-teeth, radiation pattern, one-photon polarization, and polarization of paired photons), imposes a choice between complementary modes of observation. In each experiment we have found a way to delay that choice of type of phenomenon to be looked for up to the very final stage of development of the phenomenon, and it depends on whichever type of detection device we then fix upon. That delay makes no difference in the experimental predictions. On this score everything we find was foreshadowed in that solitary and pregnant sentence of Bohr, "...it...can make no difference, as regards observable effects obtainable by a definite experimental arrangement, whether our plans for constructing or handling the instruments are fixed beforehand or whether we prefer to postpone the completion of our planning until a later moment when the particle is already on its way from one instrument to another."

== Bohmian interpretation ==
In Bohm's interpretation of quantum mechanics, the particle obeys classical mechanics except that its movement takes place under the additional influence of its quantum potential. A neutron for example has a definite trajectory and passes through one or the other of the two slits and not both, just as it is in the case of a classical particle. However the quantum particle in Bohm's interpretation is inseparable from its associated field. That field provides the quantum properties. In the delayed choice experiment, wave packets associated with the field propagate along both paths of the interferometer, but only one packet contains a particle. The field aspect of the neutron is responsible for the interference between the two paths. Changing the final setup at the detector to look for particle properties amounts to ignoring the field aspect of the neutron.

The past is determined and stays what it was up to the moment T_{1} when the experimental configuration for detecting it as a wave was changed to that of detecting a particle at the arrival time T_{2}. At T_{1}, when the experimental set up was changed, Bohm's quantum potential changes as needed, and the particle moves classically under the new quantum potential till T_{2} when it is detected as a particle. Thus Bohmian mechanics restores the conventional view of the world and its past. The past is out there as an objective history unalterable retroactively by delayed choice. The quantum potential contains information about the boundary conditions defining the system, and hence any change of the experimental set up is reflected in changes in the quantum potential which determines the dynamics of the particle.

== Experimental details ==
John Wheeler's original discussion of the possibility of a delayed choice quantum appeared in an essay entitled "Law Without Law," which was published in a book he and Wojciech Hubert Zurek edited called Quantum Theory and Measurement, pp 182–213. He introduced his remarks by reprising the argument between Albert Einstein, who wanted a comprehensible reality, and Niels Bohr, who thought that Einstein's concept of reality was too restricted. Wheeler indicates that Einstein and Bohr explored the consequences of the laboratory experiment that will be discussed below, one in which light can find its way from one corner of a rectangular array of semi-silvered and fully silvered mirrors to the other corner, and then can be made to reveal itself not only as having gone halfway around the perimeter by a single path and then exited, but also as having gone both ways around the perimeter and then to have "made a choice" as to whether to exit by one port or the other. Not only does this result hold for beams of light, but also for single photons of light. Wheeler remarked:

The experiment in the form an interferometer, discussed by Einstein and Bohr, could theoretically be used to investigate whether a photon sometimes sets off along a single path, always follows two paths but sometimes only makes use of one, or whether something else would turn up. However, it was easier to say, "We will, during random runs of the experiment, insert the second half-silvered mirror just before the photon is timed to get there," than it was to figure out a way to make such a rapid substitution. The speed of light is just too fast to permit a mechanical device to do this job, at least within the confines of a laboratory. Much ingenuity was needed to get around this problem.

After several supporting experiments were published, Jacques et al. claimed that an experiment of theirs follows fully the original scheme proposed by Wheeler. Their complicated experiment is based on the Mach–Zehnder interferometer, involving a triggered diamond N–V colour centre photon generator, polarization, and an electro-optical modulator acting as a switchable beam splitter. Measuring in a closed configuration showed interference, while measuring in an open configuration allowed the path of the particle to be determined, which made interference impossible.

=== Interferometer in the lab ===
The Wheeler version of the interferometer experiment could not be performed in a laboratory until recently because of the practical difficulty of inserting or removing the second beam-splitter in the brief time interval between the photon's entering the first beam-splitter and its arrival at the location provided for the second beam-splitter. This realization of the experiment is done by extending the lengths of both paths by inserting long lengths of fiber optic cable. So doing makes the time interval involved with transits through the apparatus much longer. A high-speed switchable device on one path, composed of a high-voltage switch, a Pockels cell, and a Glan–Thompson prism, makes it possible to divert that path away from its ordinary destination so that path effectively comes to a dead end. With the detour in operation, nothing can reach either detector by way of that path, so there can be no interference. With it switched off the path resumes its ordinary mode of action and passes through the second beam-splitter, making interference reappear. This arrangement does not actually insert and remove the second beam-splitter, but it does make it possible to switch from a state in which interference appears to a state in which interference cannot appear, and do so in the interval between light entering the first beam-splitter and light exiting the second beam-splitter. If photons had "decided" to enter the first beam-splitter as either waves or a particles, they must have been directed to undo that decision and to go through the system in their other guise, and they must have done so without any physical process being relayed to the entering photons or the first beam-splitter because that kind of transmission would be too slow even at the speed of light. Wheeler's interpretation of the physical results would be that in one configuration of the two experiments a single copy of the wavefunction of an entering photon is received, with 50% probability, at one or the other detectors, and that under the other configuration two copies of the wave function, traveling over different paths, arrive at both detectors, are out of phase with each other, and therefore exhibit interference. In one detector the wave functions will be in phase with each other, and the result will be that the photon has 100% probability of showing up in that detector. In the other detector the wave functions will be 180° out of phase, will cancel each other exactly, and there will be a 0% probability of their related photons showing up in that detector.

=== Interferometer in the cosmos ===
The cosmic experiment envisioned by Wheeler could be described either as analogous to the interferometer experiment or as analogous to a double-slit experiment. The important thing is that by a third kind of device, a massive stellar object acting as a gravitational lens, photons from a source can arrive by two pathways. Depending on how phase differences between wavefunction pairs are arranged, correspondingly different kinds of interference phenomena can be observed. Whether to merge the incoming wavefunctions or not, and how to merge the incoming wavefunctions can be controlled by experimenters. There are none of the phase differences introduced into the wavefunctions by the experimental apparatus as there are in the laboratory interferometer experiments, so despite there being no double-slit device near the light source, the cosmic experiment is closer to the double-slit experiment. However, Wheeler planned for the experiment to merge the incoming wavefunctions by use of a beam splitter.

The main difficulty in performing this experiment is that the experimenter has no control over or knowledge of lengths of each of the two paths between the distant quasar. Matching path lengths in time requires using a delay device along one path. Before that task could be done, it would be necessary to find a way to calculate the time delay.

One suggestion for synchronizing inputs from the two ends of this cosmic experimental apparatus lies in the characteristics of quasars and the possibility of identifying identical events of some signal characteristic. Information from the Twin Quasars that Wheeler used as the basis of his speculation reach earth approximately 14 months apart. Finding a way to keep a quantum of light in some kind of loop for over a year would not be easy.

=== Double-slits in lab and cosmos ===
Replace beam splitter by registering projected telescope images on a common detection screen.

Wheeler's version of the double-slit experiment is arranged so that the same photon that emerges from two slits can be detected in two ways. The first way lets the two paths come together, lets the two copies of the wavefunction overlap, and shows interference. The second way moves farther away from the photon source to a position where the distance between the two copies of the wavefunction is too great to show interference effects. The technical problem in the laboratory is how to insert a detector screen at a point appropriate to observe interference effects or to remove that screen to reveal the photon detectors that can be restricted to receiving photons from the narrow regions of space where the slits are found. One way to accomplish that task would be to use the recently developed electrically switchable mirrors and simply change directions of the two paths from the slits by switching a mirror on or off. As of early 2014 no such experiment has been announced.

The cosmic experiment described by Wheeler has other problems, but directing wavefunction copies to one place or another long after the photon involved has presumably "decided" whether to be a wave or a particle requires no great speed at all. One has about a billion years to get the job done.

The cosmic version of the interferometer experiment could be adapted to function as a cosmic double-slit device as indicated in the illustration.

=== Current experiments of interest ===
The first real experiment to follow Wheeler's intention for a double-slit apparatus to be subjected to end-game determination of detection method is the one by Walborn et al.

Researchers with access to radio telescopes originally designed for SETI research have explicated the practical difficulties of conducting the interstellar Wheeler experiment.

=== Quantum delayed choice experiments ===
Rather than mechanically activating a delay, newer versions of the delayed choice experiment design two paths controlled by quantum effects. The overall experiment then creates a superposition of the two outcomes, particle behavior or wave behavior. This line of experimentation proved very difficult to carry out when it was first conceived. Nevertheless, it has proven very valuable over the years since it has led researchers to provide "increasingly sophisticated demonstrations of the wave–particle duality of single quanta". As one experimenter explains, "Wave and particle behavior can coexist simultaneously."

A recent experiment by Manning et al. confirms the standard predictions of standard quantum mechanics with an atom of Helium.

A macroscopic quantum delayed-choice experiment has been proposed: coherent coupling of two carbon nanotubes could be controlled by amplified single phonon events.

== Conclusions ==
Ma, Zeilinger et al. have summarized what can be known as a result of experiments that have arisen from Wheeler's proposals. They say:

Our work demonstrates and confirms that whether the correlations between two entangled photons reveal welcher-weg ["which-way"] information or an interference pattern of one (system) photon depends on the choice of measurement on the other (environment) photon, even when all of the events on the two sides that can be space-like separated are space-like separated. The fact that it is possible to decide whether a wave or particle feature manifests itself long after—and even space-like separated from—the measurement teaches us that we should not have any naive realistic picture for interpreting quantum phenomena. Any explanation of what goes on in a specific individual observation of one photon has to take into account the whole experimental apparatus of the complete quantum state consisting of both photons, and it can only make sense after all information concerning complementary variables has been recorded. Our results demonstrate that the viewpoint that the system photon behaves either definitely as a wave or definitely as a particle would require faster-than-light communication. Because this would be in strong tension with the special theory of relativity, we believe that such a viewpoint should be given up entirely.

== History ==
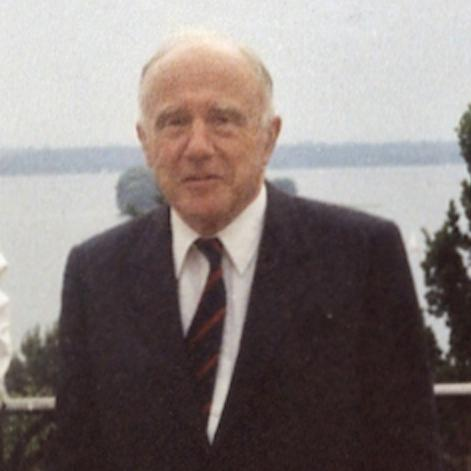
John Wheeler, 1985

The delayed-choice experiment concept began as a series of thought experiments in quantum physics, first proposed by Wheeler in 1978. According to the complementarity principle, the 'particle-like' (having exact location) or 'wave-like' (having frequency or amplitude) properties of a photon can be measured, but not both at the same time. Which characteristic is measured depends on whether experimenters use a device intended to observe particles or to observe waves. When this statement is applied very strictly, one could argue that by determining the detector type one could force the photon to become manifest only as a particle or only as a wave. Detection of a photon is generally a destructive process (see quantum nondemolition measurement for non-destructive measurements). For example, a photon can be detected as the consequences of being absorbed by an electron in a photomultiplier that accepts its energy, which is then used to trigger the cascade of events that produces a "click" from that device. In the case of the double-slit experiment, a photon appears as a highly localized point in space and time on a screen. The buildup of the photons on the screen gives an indication on whether the photon must have traveled through the slits as a wave or could have traveled as a particle. The photon is said to have traveled as a wave if the buildup results in the typical interference pattern of waves (see Double-slit experiment § Interference from individual particles for an animation showing the buildup). However, if one of the slits is closed, or two orthogonal polarizers are placed in front of the slits (making the photons passing through different slits distinguishable), then no interference pattern will appear, and the buildup can be explained as the result of the photon traveling as a particle.

== See also ==
- Delayed-choice quantum eraser
- Wheeler–Feynman time-symmetric theory

== Bibliography ==
- Jacques, Vincent; Wu, E; Grosshans, Frédéric; Treussart, François; Grangier, Philippe; Aspect, Alain; Roch, Jean-François (2007). "Experimental Realization of Wheeler's Delayed-Choice Gedanken Experiment". Science. 315 (5814): 966–8. arXiv:quant-ph/0610241. Bibcode:2007Sci...315..966J. doi:10.1126/science.1136303. PMID 17303748. S2CID 6086068.
- On-line bibliography listing all of Wheeler's works
- John Archibald Wheeler, "The 'Past' and the 'Delayed-Choice' Double-Slit Experiment," pp 9–48, in A.R. Marlow, editor, Mathematical Foundations of Quantum Theory, Academic Press (1978)
- John Archibald Wheeler and Wojciech Hubert Zurek, Quantum Theory and Measurement (Princeton Series in Physics)
- John D. Barrow, Paul C. W. Davies, and Jr, Charles L. Harperm Science and Ultimate Reality: Quantum Theory, Cosmology, and Complexity (Cambridge University Press) 2004
