= John Archibald Wheeler =

American theoretical physicist (1911–2008)

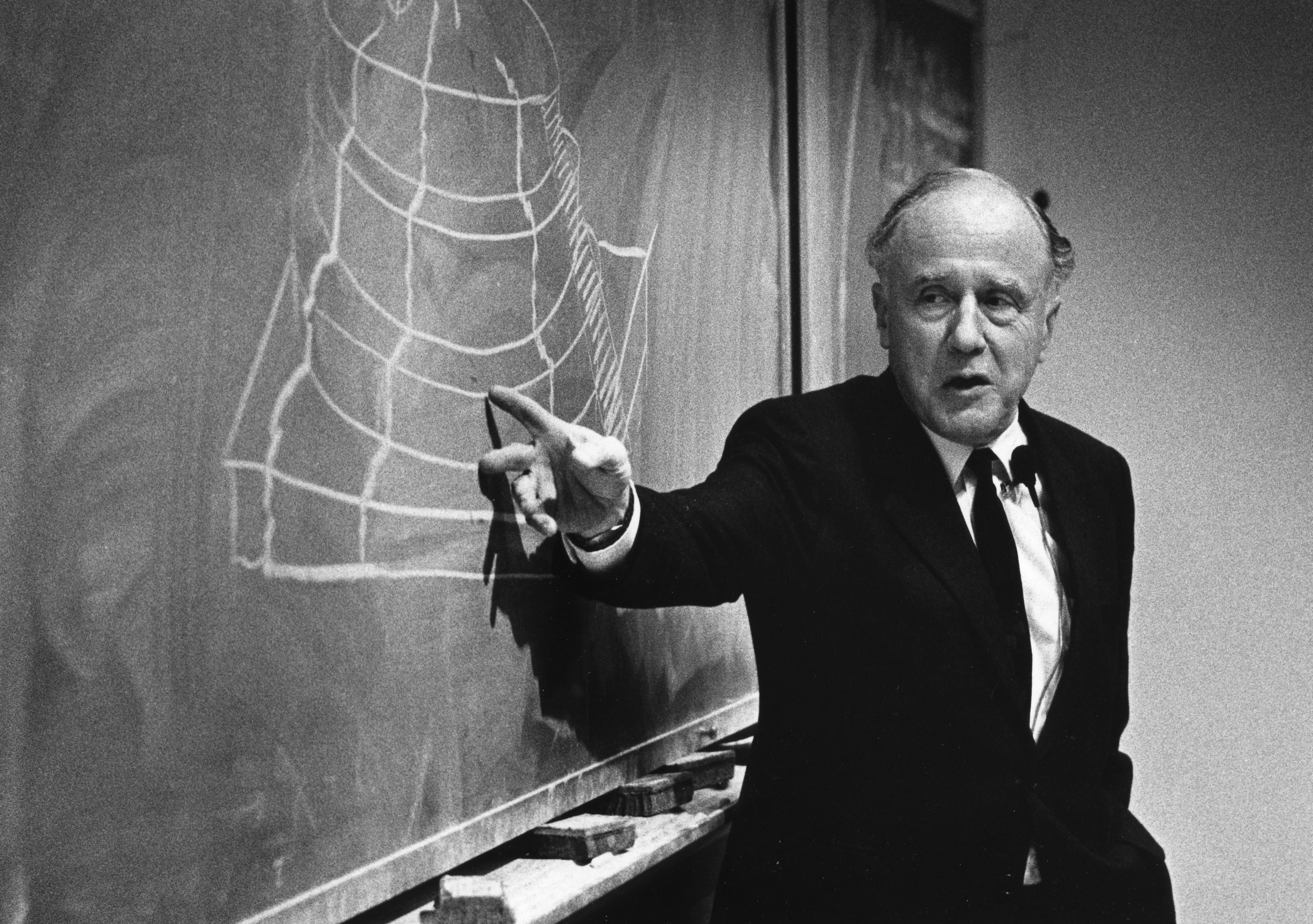
- Wheeler lecturing on "Beyond the End of Time" at the University of Missouri
- Born: July 9, 1911; Jacksonville, Florida, U.S.
- Died: April 13, 2008 (aged 96); Hightstown, New Jersey, U.S.
- Education: Johns Hopkins University (BS, MS, PhD)
- Known for: Breit–Wheeler process; Wheeler–DeWitt equation; Popularizing the term "black hole"; Nuclear fission; Geometrodynamics; General relativity; Unified field theory; Wheeler–Feynman absorber theory; Wheeler's delayed choice experiment; One-electron universe; Geon; Regge–Wheeler–Zerilli equations; S-matrix; Quantum foam; Coining the terms "neutron moderator", "superspace", "wormhole"; Lorentzian wormhole; "It from bit"; Participatory anthropic principle
- Spouse: Janette Hegner (1908-2007)
- Awards: A. Cressy Morrison Prize (1945); Albert Einstein Award (1965); Enrico Fermi Award (1968); Franklin Medal (1969); National Medal of Science (1970); Oersted Medal (1983); J. Robert Oppenheimer Memorial Prize (1984); Albert Einstein Medal (1988); Matteucci Medal (1993); Wolf Prize in Physics (1997); Einstein Prize (APS) (2003)
- Scientific career
- Fields: Physics
- Workplaces: University of North Carolina at Chapel Hill; Princeton University; University of Texas at Austin
- Thesis: Theory of the dispersion and absorption of helium (1933)
- Doctoral advisor: Karl Herzfeld
- Doctoral students: See list: Jacob Bekenstein; Claudio Bunster; Demetrios Christodoulou; Ignazio Ciufolini; Hugh Everett; Richard Feynman; Kenneth W. Ford; Robert W. Fuller; Robert Geroch; John R. Klauder; Bahram Mashhoon; Charles Misner; Gilbert Plass; Milton Plesset; Gerald Harris Rosen; Benjamin Schumacher; Kip Thorne; Jayme Tiomno; John S. Toll; Bill Unruh; Robert Wald; Katharine Way; Arthur Wightman; Cheuk-Yin Wong

John Archibald Wheeler (July 9, 1911 – April 13, 2008) was an American theoretical physicist. He was largely responsible for reviving interest in general relativity in the United States after World War II. Wheeler also worked with Niels Bohr to explain the basic principles of nuclear fission. Together with Gregory Breit, Wheeler explored positron-electron pair production from the collision of two photons, now known as the Breit–Wheeler process. He is known for popularizing the term "black hole" to describe the gravitationally completely collapsed objects predicted by general relativity. He also coined "quantum foam", "neutron moderator", "wormhole" and "it from bit", and hypothesized the "one-electron universe". Stephen Hawking called Wheeler the "hero of the black hole story".

At 21, Wheeler earned his doctorate at Johns Hopkins University under the supervision of Karl Herzfeld. He studied under Breit and Bohr on a National Research Council fellowship. In 1939 he collaborated with Bohr on a series of papers using the liquid drop model to explain the mechanism of fission. During World War II, he worked with the Manhattan Project's Metallurgical Laboratory in Chicago, where he helped design nuclear reactors, and then at the Hanford Site in Richland, Washington, where he helped DuPont build them. He returned to Princeton after the war but returned to government service to help design and build the hydrogen bomb in the early 1950s. He and Edward Teller were the main civilian proponents of thermonuclear weapons.

For most of his career, Wheeler was a professor of physics at Princeton University, which he joined in 1938, remaining until 1976. At Princeton he supervised 46 PhD students, more than any other physics professor.

Wheeler left Princeton at the age of 65. He was appointed director of the Center for Theoretical Physics at the University of Texas at Austin in 1976 and remained in the position until 1986, when he retired and became a professor emeritus. With Kip Thorne and Charles Misner, he coauthored the general relativity textbook Gravitation.

== Early life and education ==
Wheeler was born in Jacksonville, Florida, on July 9, 1911, to librarians Joseph L. Wheeler and Mabel Archibald (Archie) Wheeler. He was the oldest of four children. His brother Joseph earned a PhD from Brown University and a Master of Library Science from Columbia University. His brother Robert earned a PhD in geology from Harvard University and worked as a geologist for oil companies and several colleges. His sister Mary studied library science at the University of Denver and became a librarian. They grew up in Youngstown, Ohio, but spent a year in 1921 to 1922 on a farm in Benson, Vermont, where Wheeler attended a one-room school. When they returned to Youngstown he attended Rayen High School.

After graduating from Baltimore City College high school in 1926, Wheeler entered Johns Hopkins University with a scholarship from the state of Maryland. He published his first scientific paper in 1930, as part of a summer job at the National Bureau of Standards. He earned his doctorate in 1933. His dissertation research work, carried out under the supervision of Karl Herzfeld, was on the "Theory of the Dispersion and Absorption of Helium". He received a National Research Council fellowship, which he used to study under Gregory Breit at New York University in 1933 and 1934, and then in Copenhagen under Niels Bohr in 1934 and 1935. In a 1934 paper, Breit and Wheeler introduced the Breit–Wheeler process, a mechanism by which photons can be potentially transformed into matter in the form of electron–positron pairs.

== Early career ==
The University of North Carolina at Chapel Hill made Wheeler an associate professor in 1937, but he wanted to be able to work more closely with experts in particle physics. He turned down an offer in 1938 of an associate professorship at Johns Hopkins University in favor of an assistant professorship at Princeton University. Although it was a lesser position, he felt that Princeton, which was building up its physics department, was a better career choice. He remained a member of its faculty until 1976.

In his 1937 paper "On the Mathematical Description of Light Nuclei by the Method of Resonating Group Structure", Wheeler introduced the S-matrix—short for scattering matrix—"a unitary matrix of coefficients connecting the asymptotic behavior of an arbitrary particular solution [of the integral equations] with that of solutions of a standard form". Wheeler did not pursue this idea, but in the 1940s Werner Heisenberg developed the idea of the S-matrix into an important tool in elementary particle physics.

In 1938 Wheeler joined Edward Teller in examining Bohr's liquid drop model of the atomic nucleus; they presented their results at a meeting of the American Physical Society in New York. Wheeler's Chapel Hill graduate student Katharine Way also presented a paper, which she followed up in a subsequent article, detailing how the liquid drop model was unstable under certain conditions. Due to a limitation of the liquid drop model, they all missed the opportunity to predict nuclear fission. In 1939, Bohr brought the news of Lise Meitner's and Otto Frisch's discovery of fission to America. Bohr told Leon Rosenfeld, who informed Wheeler.

Bohr and Wheeler set to work applying the liquid drop model to explain the mechanism of nuclear fission. As the experimental physicists studied fission, they uncovered puzzling results. George Placzek asked Bohr why uranium seemed to fission with both very fast and very slow neutrons. Walking to a meeting with Wheeler, Bohr had an insight that fission at low energies was due to the uranium-235 isotope, while at high energies it was mainly due to the far more abundant uranium-238 isotope. They co-wrote two more papers on fission. Their first paper appeared in Physical Review on September 1, 1939, the day Germany invaded Poland, starting World War II.

Considering the notion that positrons were electrons traveling backward in time, in 1940 Wheeler conceived his one-electron universe postulate: that there was in fact only one electron, bouncing back and forth in time. His graduate student Richard Feynman found this hard to believe, but the idea that positrons were electrons traveling backward in time intrigued him, and Feynman incorporated the notion of the reversibility of time in his Feynman diagrams.

== Nuclear weapons ==
=== Manhattan Project ===
Soon after the Japanese bombing of Pearl Harbor brought the U.S. into World War II, Wheeler accepted a request from Arthur Compton to join the Manhattan Project's Metallurgical Laboratory at the University of Chicago. He moved there in January 1942, joining Eugene Wigner's group, which was studying nuclear reactor design. He co-wrote a paper with Robert F. Christy on "Chain Reaction of Pure Fissionable Materials in Solution", which was important in the plutonium purification process. It was declassified in December 1955. He gave the neutron moderator its name, replacing Enrico Fermi's term, "slower downer".

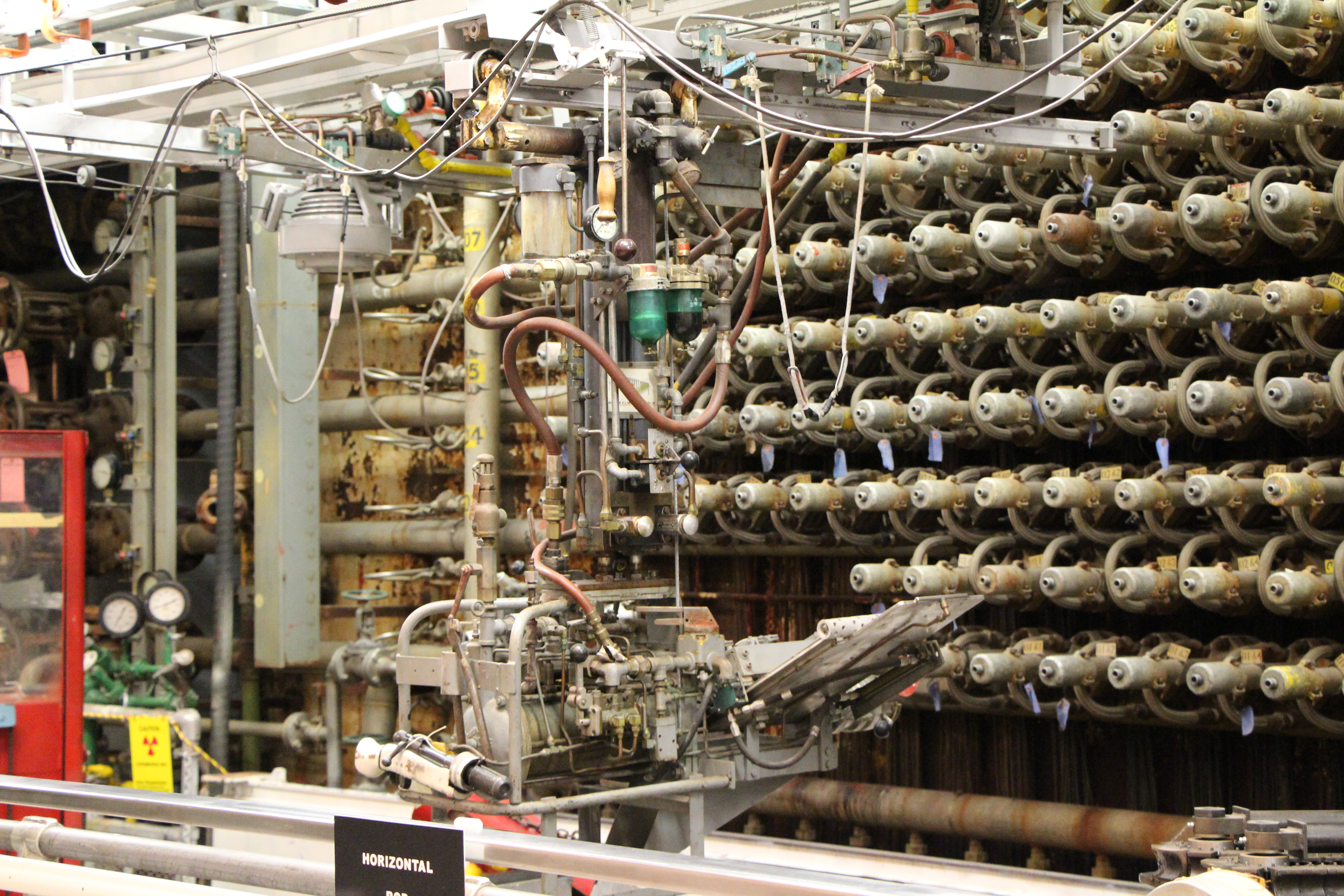
Loading tubes of the Hanford B Reactor

After the United States Army Corps of Engineers took over the Manhattan Project, it gave DuPont responsibility for the detailed design and construction of the reactors. Wheeler became part of DuPont's design staff. He worked closely with its engineers, commuting between Chicago and Wilmington, Delaware, where DuPont had its headquarters. He moved his family to Wilmington in March 1943. DuPont's task was to build not just nuclear reactors, but an entire plutonium production complex at the Hanford Site in Washington. As work progressed, Wheeler relocated his family again in July 1944, to Richland, Washington, where he worked in the scientific buildings known as the 300 area.

Even before the Hanford Site started up the B Reactor, the first of its three reactors, on September 15, 1944, Wheeler had been concerned that some nuclear fission products might be nuclear poisons, the accumulation of which would impede the ongoing nuclear chain reaction by absorbing many of the thermal neutrons needed to continue a chain reaction. In an April 1942 report, he predicted that this would reduce the reactivity by less than one percent so long as no fission product had a neutron capture cross section of more than 100,000 barns. After the reactor unexpectedly shut down, and then just as unexpectedly restarted about 15 hours later, he suspected iodine-135, with a half-life of 6.6 hours, and its daughter product, xenon-135, which has a half-life of 9.2 hours. Xenon-135 turned out to have a neutron capture cross-section of well over two million barns. The problem was corrected by adding additional fuel slugs to burn out the poison.

Wheeler had a personal reason for working on the Manhattan Project. His brother Joe, fighting in Italy, sent him a postcard with a simple message: "Hurry up". It was already too late: Joe was killed in October 1944. "Here we were", Wheeler later wrote, "so close to creating a nuclear weapon to end the war. I couldn't stop thinking then, and haven't stopped thinking since, that the war could have been over in October 1944." Joe left a widow and baby daughter, Mary Jo, who later married physicist James Hartle.

=== Hydrogen bomb ===
In August 1945 Wheeler and his family returned to Princeton, where he resumed his academic career. Working with Feynman, he explored the possibility of physics with particles, but not fields, and carried out theoretical studies of the muon with Jayme Tiomno, resulting in a series of papers on the topic, including a 1949 paper in which Tiomno and Wheeler introduced the "Tiomno Triangle", which related different forms of radioactive decay. He also suggested the use of muons as a nuclear probe. This paper, written and privately circulated in 1949 but not published until 1953, resulted in a series of measurements of the Chang radiation emitted by muons. Muons are a component of cosmic rays, and Wheeler became the founder and first director of Princeton's Cosmic Rays Laboratory, which received a grant of $375,000 from the Office of Naval Research in 1948. Wheeler received a Guggenheim Fellowship in 1946, which allowed him to spend the 1949–50 academic year in Paris.

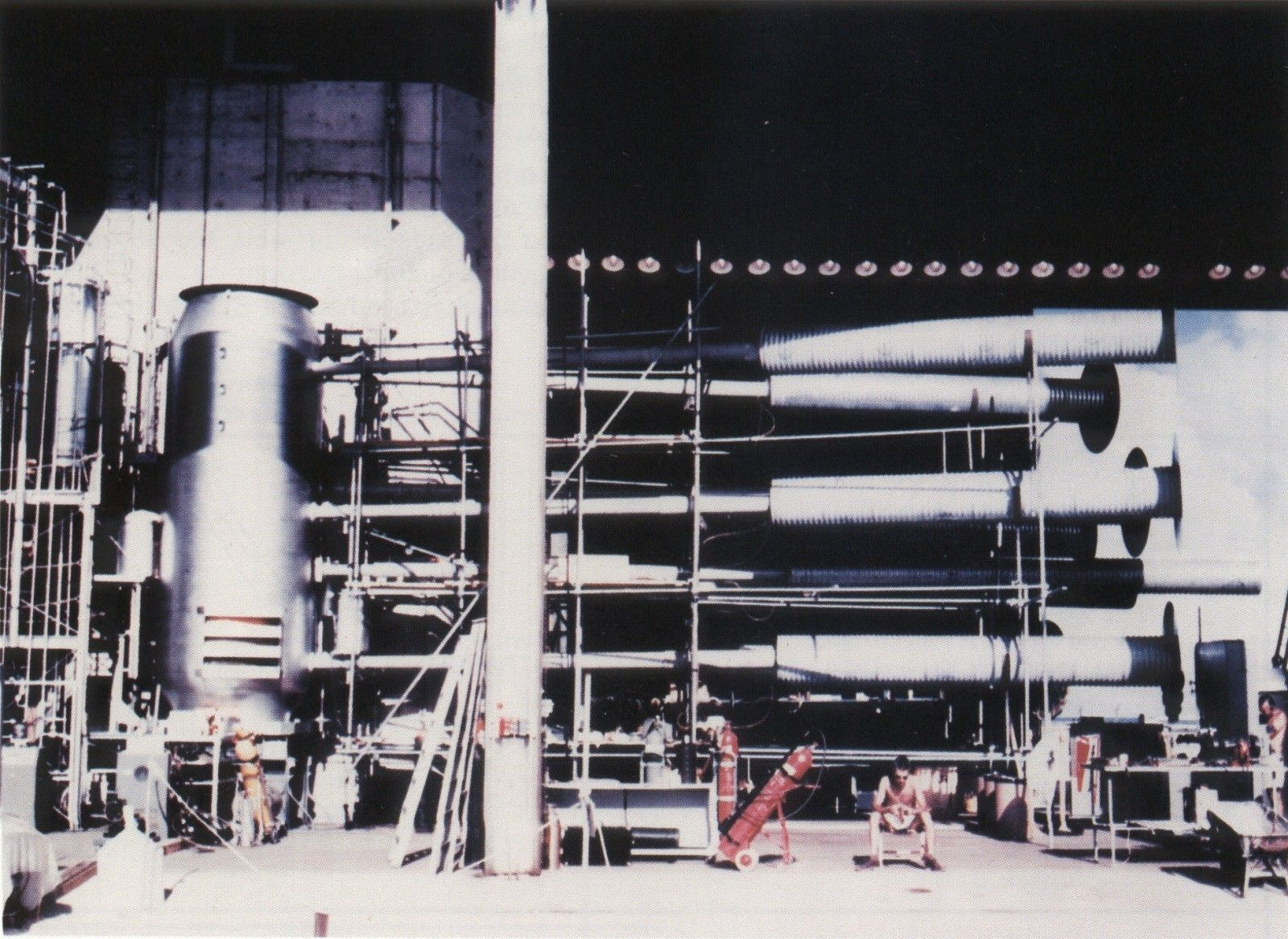
The "Sausage" device of Ivy Mike nuclear test on Enewetak Atoll. The Sausage was the first true hydrogen bomb ever tested.

The 1949 detonation of Joe-1 by the Soviet Union prompted an all-out effort by the United States, led by Teller, to develop the more powerful hydrogen bomb in response. Henry D. Smyth, Wheeler's department head at Princeton, asked him to join the effort. Most physicists were, like Wheeler, trying to reestablish careers interrupted by the war and reluctant to face more disruption. Others had moral objections. Those who agreed to participate included Emil Konopinski, Marshall Rosenbluth, Lothar Nordheim, and Charles Critchfield, but there was also now a body of experienced weapons physicists at the Los Alamos Laboratory, led by Norris Bradbury. Wheeler agreed to go to Los Alamos after a conversation with Bohr. Two of his graduate students from Princeton, Ken Ford and John Toll, joined him there.

At Los Alamos, Wheeler and his family moved into the house on "Bathtub Row" that Robert Oppenheimer and his family had occupied during the war. In 1950 there was no practical design for a hydrogen bomb. Calculations by Stanisław Ulam and others showed that Teller's "Classical Super" would not work. Teller and Wheeler created a new design known as "Alarm Clock", but it was not a true thermonuclear weapon. Not until January 1951 did Ulam come up with a workable design.

In 1951 Wheeler obtained Bradbury's permission to set up a branch office of the Los Alamos laboratory at Princeton, known as Project Matterhorn, which had two parts. Matterhorn S (for stellarator, another name coined by Wheeler), under Lyman Spitzer, investigated nuclear fusion as a power source. Matterhorn B (for bomb), under Wheeler, did nuclear weapons research. Senior scientists remained uninterested and aloof from the project, so he staffed it with young graduate and postdoctoral students. Matterhorn B's efforts were crowned by the success of the Ivy Mike nuclear test at Enewetak Atoll in the Pacific, on November 1, 1952, which Wheeler witnessed. The yield of the Ivy Mike "Sausage" device was reckoned at 10.4 megatons of TNT (44 PJ), about 30 percent higher than Matterhorn B had estimated.

In January 1953 Wheeler was involved in a security breach when he lost a highly classified paper on lithium-6 and the hydrogen bomb design during an overnight train trip. This resulted in an official reprimand.

Matterhorn B was discontinued, but Matterhorn S endures as the Princeton Plasma Physics Laboratory.

== Later academic career ==
After concluding his Matterhorn Project work, Wheeler resumed his academic career. In a 1955 paper, he theoretically investigated the geon, an electromagnetic or gravitational wave held together in a confined region by the attraction of its own field. He coined the name as a contraction of "gravitational electromagnetic entity". He found that the smallest geon was a toroid the size of the Sun, but millions of times heavier. He later showed that geons are unstable, and would quickly self destruct if they were ever to form.

=== Geometrodynamics ===
During the 1950s, Wheeler formulated geometrodynamics, a program of physical and ontological reduction of every physical phenomenon, such as gravitation and electromagnetism, to the geometrical properties of a curved space-time. His research on the subject was published in 1957 and 1961. Wheeler envisaged the fabric of the universe as a chaotic subatomic realm of quantum fluctuations, which he called "quantum foam".

=== General relativity ===
General relativity had been considered a less respectable field of physics, being detached from experiment. Wheeler was a key figure in its revival, leading the school at Princeton, while Dennis William Sciama and Yakov Borisovich Zel'dovich developed the subject at Cambridge University and the University of Moscow, respectively. Wheeler and his students made substantial contributions to the field during the Golden Age of General Relativity.

While working on mathematical extensions to Einstein's general relativity in 1957, Wheeler introduced the concept and word wormhole to describe hypothetical "tunnels" in space-time. Bohr asked whether they were stable and further research by Wheeler determined that they are not. His work in general relativity included the theory of gravitational collapse. He used the term black hole in 1967 during a talk he gave at the NASA Goddard Institute of Space Studies (GISS), although the term had been used earlier in the decade. (Note: American astrophysicist and publisher Hong-Yee Chiu said he remembered a seminar in Princeton University perhaps as early as 1960, when the physicist Robert H. Dicke spoke about gravitationally collapsed objects as "like the Black Hole of Calcutta". According to science writer Marcia Bartusiak, the term had been used in 1963 at an astrophysics conference in Dallas.)

He used it in a 1967 lecture for the American Association for the Advancement of Science, "Our Universe, Known and Unknown":

[B]y reason of its faster and faster infall [the surface of the imploding star] moves away from the [distant] observer more and more rapidly. The light is shifted to the red. It becomes dimmer millisecond by millisecond, and in less than a second is too dark to see...[The star], like the Cheshire cat, fades from view. One leaves only its grin, the other, only its gravitational attraction. Gravitational attraction, yes; light, no. ... Moreover, light and particles incident from outside [and] going down the black hole only add to its mass and increase its gravitational attraction.

Wheeler said the term was suggested to him during a lecture when a member of the audience was tired of hearing Wheeler say "gravitationally completely collapsed object". Wheeler was also a pioneer in the field of quantum gravity due to his development, with Bryce DeWitt, of the Wheeler–DeWitt equation in 1967. Stephen Hawking later described Wheeler and DeWitt's work as the equation governing the "wave function of the Universe".

=== Quantum information ===
Wheeler left Princeton in 1976 at age 65. He was appointed director of the Center for Theoretical Physics at the University of Texas at Austin in 1976 and remained in the position until 1986, when he retired and became a professor emeritus. Misner, Thorne and Wojciech Zurek, all former students of Wheeler, wrote:

Looking back on Wheeler's 10 years at Texas, many quantum information scientists now regard him, along with IBM's Rolf Landauer, as a grandfather of their field. That, however, was not because Wheeler produced seminal research papers on quantum information. He did not—with one major exception, his delayed-choice experiment. Rather, his role was to inspire by asking deep questions from a radical conservative viewpoint and, through his questions, to stimulate others' research and discovery.

Wheeler's delayed-choice experiment describes a family of thought experiments in quantum physics that he proposed, with the most prominent of them appearing in 1978 and 1984. These experiments seek to discover whether light somehow "senses" the experimental apparatus that it travels through in the double-slit experiment, adjusting its behavior to fit by assuming an appropriate determinate state, or whether it remains in an indeterminate state, neither wave nor particle, and responds to the "questions" the experimental arrangements ask of it in either a wave-consistent manner or a particle-consistent manner.

=== Teaching ===
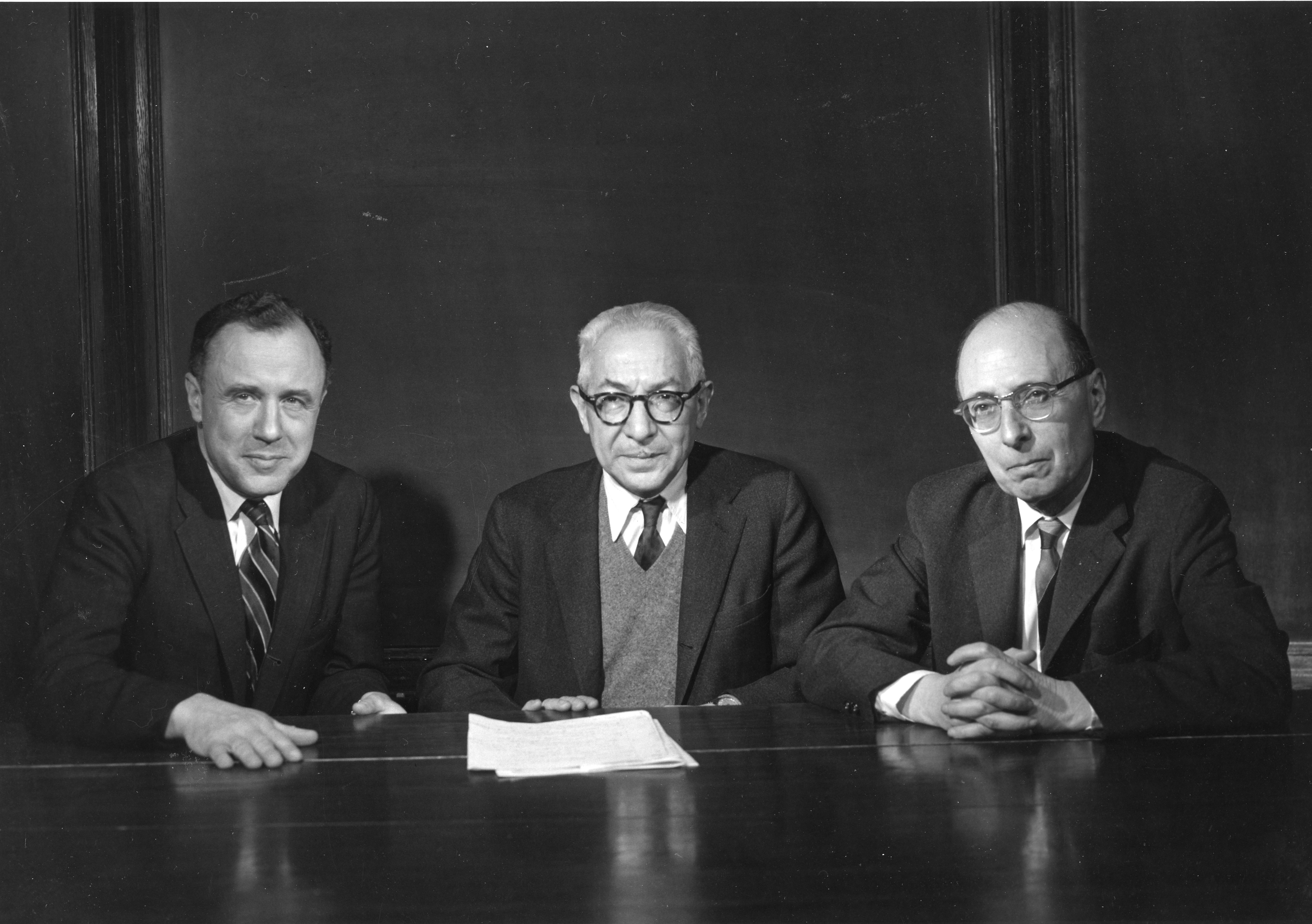
Wheeler, I. I. Rabi, and Eugene Wigner

Wheeler's graduate students included Jacob Bekenstein, Hugh Everett, Peter Putnam, John R. Klauder, Charles Misner, William Unruh, Robert M. Wald, Katharine Way, Arthur Wightman, and Nobel laureates Richard Feynman and Kip Thorne. Wheeler placed a high priority on teaching and continued to teach freshman and sophomore physics, emphasizing the importance of engaging students early in their education. Several of the undergraduate students he mentored, including Christopher Fuchs, James Hartle, and Daniel Holz, among many others, would also lead prominent physics careers. At Princeton he supervised 46 PhDs, more than any other physics professor. Wheeler wrote a supportive review article to help Hugh Everett's work, wrote to and met with Niels Bohr in Copenhagen seeking his approval of Everett's approach, and continued to advocate for Everett even after Bohr's rejection. With Kent Harrison, Kip Thorne, and Masami Wakano, Wheeler wrote Gravitation Theory and Gravitational Collapse (1965). This led to the voluminous general relativity textbook Gravitation (1973), co-written with Misner and Thorne. Its timely appearance during the golden age of general relativity and its comprehensiveness made it an influential relativity textbook for a generation. Wheeler and Edwin F. Taylor wrote Spacetime Physics (1966) and Scouting Black Holes (1996).

Alluding to Wheeler's "mass without mass", the festschrift honoring his 60th birthday was titled Magic Without Magic: John Archibald Wheeler: A Collection of Essays in Honor of his Sixtieth Birthday (1972). His writing style could also attract parodies, including one by "John Archibald Wyler" that was affectionately published by a relativity journal.

=== Participatory anthropic principle ===
Wheeler speculated that reality is created by observers in the universe. "How does something arise from nothing?", he asked about the existence of space and time. He also coined the term "Participatory Anthropic Principle" (PAP), a version of a strong anthropic principle.

In developing the participatory anthropic principle, an interpretation of quantum mechanics, Wheeler used a variant on Twenty Questions, called Negative Twenty Questions, to show how the questions we choose to ask about the universe may dictate the answers we get. In this variant, the respondent does not choose or decide upon any particular or definite object beforehand, but only on a pattern of "Yes" or "No" answers. This variant requires the respondent to provide a consistent set of answers to successive questions, so that each answer can be viewed as logically compatible with all the previous ones. In this way, successive questions narrow the options until the questioner settles upon a definite object. Wheeler's theory was that, in an analogous manner, consciousness may play some role in bringing the universe into existence.

From a transcript of a radio interview on "The Anthropic Universe":

Wheeler: We are participators in bringing into being not only the near and here but the far away and long ago. We are in this sense, participators in bringing about something of the universe in the distant past and if we have one explanation for what's happening in the distant past why should we need more?
Martin Redfern: Many don't agree with John Wheeler, but if he's right then we and presumably other conscious observers throughout the universe, are the creators—or at least the minds that make the universe manifest.

=== It from bit ===
In 1990, Wheeler suggested that at the smallest scale physics is binary. The amount of information needed to describe the universe is not infinite but ultimately limited to binary choices.

According to this "it from bit" concept, all things physical are information-theoretic in origin:

Wheeler: It from bit. Otherwise put, every it—every particle, every field of force, even the space-time continuum itself—derives its function, its meaning, its very existence entirely—even if in some contexts indirectly—from the apparatus-elicited answers to yes-or-no questions, binary choices, bits. It from bit symbolizes the idea that every item of the physical world has at bottom—at a very deep bottom, in most instances—an immaterial source and explanation; that which we call reality arises in the last analysis from the posing of yes–no questions and the registering of equipment-evoked responses; in short, that all things physical are information-theoretic in origin and that this is a participatory universe.

The idea that information is more fundamental than the matter that conveys the information has slowly become a central concept in physics.

=== Opposition to parapsychology ===
In 1979, Wheeler spoke to the American Association for the Advancement of Science (AAAS), asking it to expel parapsychology, which had been admitted ten years earlier at Margaret Mead's request. He called it a pseudoscience, saying he did not oppose earnest research into the questions, but thought the "air of legitimacy" of being an AAAS affiliate should be reserved until convincing tests of at least a few so-called psi effects could be demonstrated. In the question-and-answer period following his presentation "Not consciousness, but the distinction between the probe and the probed, as central to the elemental quantum act of observation", Wheeler incorrectly said that J. B. Rhine had committed fraud as a student, for which he apologized in a subsequent letter to the journal Science. His request was turned down and the Parapsychological Association remained a member of the AAAS.

== Personal life ==
For 72 years, Wheeler was married to Janette Hegner, a teacher and social worker. They became engaged on their third date, but agreed to defer marriage until he returned from Europe. They were married on June 10, 1935, five days after his return. Employment was difficult to find during the Great Depression. Arthur Ruark offered Wheeler a position as an assistant professor at the University of North Carolina at Chapel Hill, at an annual salary of $2,300, which was less than the $2,400 Janette was offered to teach at the Rye Country Day School. They had three children.

Wheeler and Hegner were founding members of the Unitarian Church of Princeton, and she initiated the Friends of the Princeton Public Library. In their later years, Hegner accompanied him on sabbaticals in France, Los Alamos, New Mexico, the Netherlands, and Japan. Hegner died in October 2007 at the age of 96.

== Death and legacy ==
Wheeler won numerous prizes and awards, including the Golden Plate Award of the American Academy of Achievement in 1966, the Enrico Fermi Award in 1968, the Franklin Medal in 1969, the Einstein Prize in 1969, the National Medal of Science in 1971, the Niels Bohr International Gold Medal in 1982, the Oersted Medal in 1983, the J. Robert Oppenheimer Memorial Prize in 1984, and the Wolf Foundation Prize in 1997. He was a member of the American Philosophical Society, the Royal Academy, the Accademia Nazionale dei Lincei, and the Century Association. He received honorary degrees from 18 different institutions. In 2001, Princeton used a $3 million gift to establish the John Archibald Wheeler/Battelle Professorship in Physics. After his death, the University of Texas named the John A. Wheeler Lecture Hall in his honor.

On April 13, 2008, Wheeler died of pneumonia at the age of 96 in Hightstown, New Jersey.

== Works ==
- Wheeler, John Archibald (1962). Geometrodynamics. New York: Academic Press. OCLC 1317194.
- Harrison, B. Kent; Kip S. Thorne; Masami Wakano; John Archibald Wheeler (1965). Gravitation Theory and Gravitational Collapse. Chicago: The University of Chicago Press. LCCN 65017293.
- Misner, Charles W.; Kip S. Thorne; John Archibald Wheeler (September 1973). Gravitation. San Francisco: W. H. Freeman. ISBN 0-7167-0344-0.
- Wheeler, John Archibald (1979). Some Men and Moments in the History of Nuclear Physics: The Interplay of Colleagues and Motivations. Minneapolis: University of Minnesota Press. OCLC 6025422.
- Wheeler, John Archibald (1990). A Journey Into Gravity and Spacetime. Scientific American Library. New York: W.H. Freeman. ISBN 0-7167-6034-7.
- Taylor, Edwin F.; Wheeler, John Archibald (1992). Spacetime Physics: Introduction to Special Relativity. New York: W. H. Freeman. ISBN 0-7167-2327-1.
- Wheeler, John Archibald (1994). At Home in the Universe. New York: American Institute of Physics. ISBN 1-56396-500-3.
- Ciufolini, Ignazio; Wheeler, John Archibald (1995). Gravitation and Inertia. Princeton, New Jersey: Princeton University Press. ISBN 0-691-03323-4.
- Wheeler, John Archibald (1998). Geons, Black Holes, and Quantum Foam: A Life in Physics. New York: W.W. Norton & Co. ISBN 0-393-04642-7. Description & arrow/scrollable preview.
- Taylor, Edwin F.; Wheeler, John Archibald (2000). Exploring Black Holes: Introduction to General Relativity. Addison Wesley. ISBN 0-201-38423-X.
