= Stephanie Wehner =

German physicist and computer scientist

- Born: 8 May 1977 (age 49); Würzburg, Germany
- Education: University of Amsterdam
- Scientific career
- Fields: Physics; Cryptography; Computer Science
- Workplaces: University of Amsterdam; California Institute of Technology; National University of Singapore; Delft University of Technology
- Thesis: Cryptography in a Quantum World (2008)
- Doctoral advisor: Harry Buhrman

Stephanie Dorothea Christine Wehner (born 8 May 1977 in Würzburg) is a German physicist and computer scientist.

She is director and co-founder of the European Quantum Internet Alliance, a Professor at QuTech, Delft University of Technology. and a member of the Royal Netherlands Academy of Arts and Sciences.

== Education and early life ==
She studied at the University of Amsterdam and obtained her Ph.D. at CWI. Following this, she moved to Caltech as a postdoctoral researcher (under John Preskill).

Wehner was involved in computer security, for example, kernel rootkits, and worked as a professional hacker.

== Career ==
From 2010 to 2014, Wehner was an assistant professor and later associate professor at the Department of Computer Science at the National University of Singapore and a principal investigator at the Centre for Quantum Technologies. In 2014, she started as associate professor at QuTech, Delft University of Technology and as of 2016, she is Antoni van Leeuwenhoek professor at the Delft University of Technology.

== Research ==
Wehner's research extends over a broad spectrum of information processing in quantum mechanical systems, with a special focus on quantum cryptography, quantum communications and quantum networking. In quantum cryptography, she is best known for introducing the noisy-storage model in quantum cryptography. Wehner's research focuses mainly on quantum cryptography and quantum communications.

In quantum networking, Wehner made fundamental contributions to shaping the field, including setting forth a vision for the road ahead. She has developed the first link layer for quantum networks, as well as the first operating system that allows programming quantum network applications and executing them on quantum network nodes.

Wehner has also worked on using the perspective of information processing to understand physics. Together with Jonathan Oppenheim, she discovered that the amount of non-locality in quantum mechanics is limited by the uncertainty principle.

== QCRYPT conference ==
In 2011, Wehner and Matthias Christandl founded the QCRYPT conference series. QCrypt is held once a year, with a location rotating between Europe, Asia and America.

== Quantum Internet Alliance ==
Stephanie Wehner is the director and co-founder of the Quantum Internet Alliance, a European initiative founded in 2017 with the goal to build a prototype Quantum Internet. Currently, the Quantum Internet Alliance is supported by the European Commission via a Framework Partnership Agreement.

== Publications ==
Her publications include:

- Oppenheim, Jonathan, and Stephanie Wehner. "The uncertainty principle determines the nonlocality of quantum mechanics." Science 330.6007 (2010): 1072–1074.
- Hensen, Bas, et al. "Loophole-free Bell inequality violation using electron spins separated by 1.3 kilometres." Nature 526.7575 (2015): 682.

== Awards ==
Wehner received the Ammodo Science Award in 2019. In 2022 she was elected to the Royal Netherlands Academy of Arts and Sciences. In 2025, she was awarded the Körber European Science Prize.
