= Angela Sara Cacciapuoti =

Italian telecommunications engineer

Angela Sara Cacciapuoti is an Italian telecommunication engineer, known for her research on the quantum internet design. Currently, she is Full Professor at the University of Naples Federico II, where she teaches quantum information and quantum communication networks.

== Biography ==
Angela Sara Cacciapuoti graduated with honors in Telecommunications Engineering in 2005 from the University of Naples Federico II, where she later obtained a Ph.D. in Electronic and Telecommunications Engineering in 2009. She has conducted several research visits worldwide. Currently she co-leads the Quantum Internet Research Group at the University of Naples Federico II.

== Research ==
Cacciapuoti is a researcher in the field of quantum communications and networks. She has received multiple awards and recognitions for her research contributions. Her research seeks to pave the ground for a better understanding of the challenges and technical leaps necessary to achieve the ultimate vision of the Quantum Internet, recognized worldwide as the final stage of the quantum revolution, opening fundamentally new communications and computing capabilities beyond simple quantum cryptography. In 2024, she received an ERC-Consolidator Grant for her project "QNattyNet - Quantum Native Communication Networks: from Quantum Message to Quantum Functioning".

== Awards ==
Cacciapuoti has received numerous awards for her research, including the "2024 IEEE ComSoc Award for Advances in Communication" for "Quantum Internet: Networking Challenges in Distributed Quantum Computing" and the "2022 IEEE ComSoc Best Tutorial Paper" award for "When Entanglement Meets Classical Communications: Quantum Teleportation for the Quantum Internet". In 2022 she also received the "2022 WICE Outstanding Achievement Award", from the IEEE ComSoc Women in Communications Engineering (WICE), for her research contributions in the quantum field, and the "2021 N2Women: Stars in Networking and Communications".

As a role model, she has received several recognitions, including the recent "Italian InspringFifty 2024 award", assigned every three years for recognizing female excellence in 50 women who have distinguished themselves in various capacities in the world of technology. And the WE Award "Women Excellence" 2024, Women at the Top 2024, by Sole 24 Ore in collaboration with the Financial Times.
