= Carlton M. Caves =

American physicist

Carlton (Carl) Caves
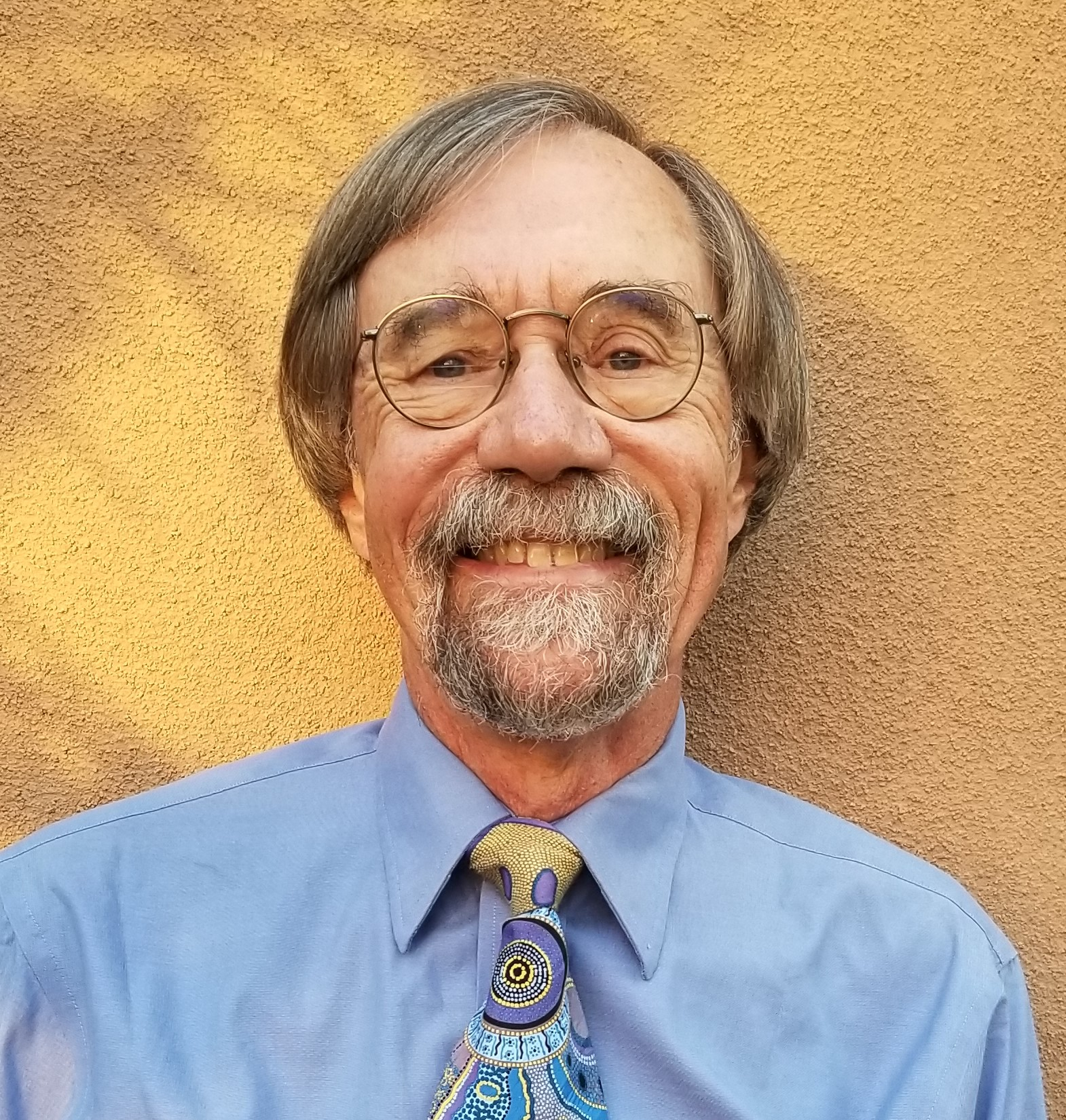
- Caves in October 2020
- Born: 24 October 1950 (age 75); Muskogee, Oklahoma
- Citizenship: United States
- Education: Rice University; Caltech
- Known for: Quantum information, quantum metrology
- Awards: Einstein Prize (1990); Max Born Award (2011); Micius Quantum Prize (2020)
- Scientific career
- Fields: Physics
- Workplaces: University of New Mexico; Caltech; University of Southern California
- Doctoral advisor: Kip Thorne
- Doctoral students: Sergio Boixo; Samuel L. Braunstein; Christopher A. Fuchs; Michael Nielsen

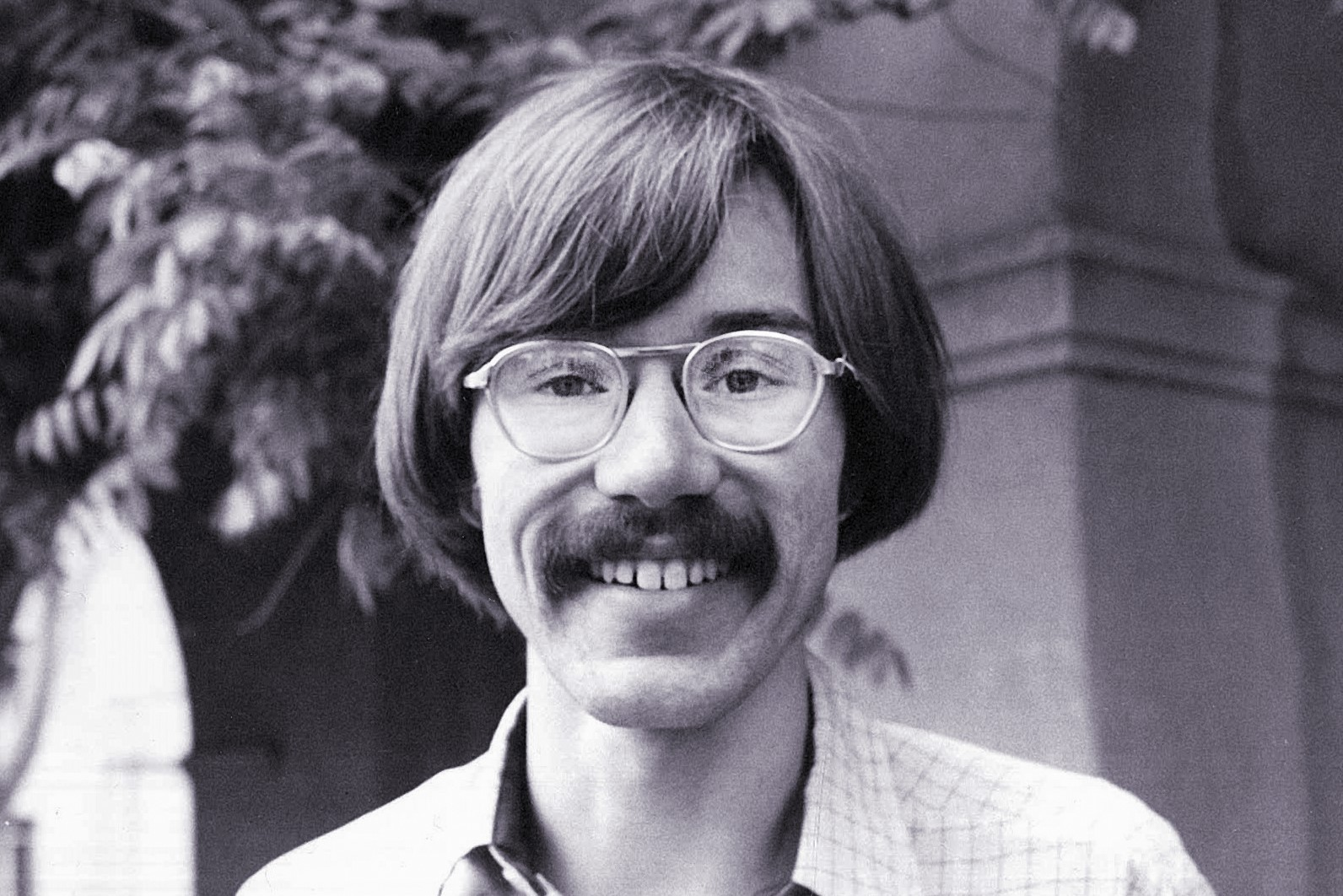
Carlton M. Caves on the north side of Bridge Laboratory at Caltech, late 1970s,

Carlton Morris Caves is an American theoretical physicist. He is currently professor emeritus and research professor of physics and astronomy at the University of New Mexico. Caves works in the areas of physics of information; information, entropy, and complexity; quantum information theory; quantum chaos, quantum optics; the theory of non-classical light; the theory of quantum noise; and the quantum theory of measurement. He is a Fellow of the American Physical Society and of the American Association for the Advancement of Science and is a member of the US National Academy of Sciences.

== Background and education ==
Caves was born in Muskogee, Oklahoma, on October 24, 1950, the son of Morris and Mary Caves. He attended public schools in Muskogee and graduated from Muskogee Central High School (now Muskogee High School) in 1968. One of his chief high-school activities was participation in MHS's speech and debate program; his debate partner, Mike Synar, served as Congressperson from the Muskogee district from 1979 to 1994. Caves attended Rice University as an undergraduate, receiving a BA in physics and mathematics in 1972, and then was a graduate student at the California Institute of Technology, where he received a PhD in physics in 1979. His PhD research, culminating in a dissertation entitled Theoretical Investigations of Experimental Gravitation, was carried out under the supervision of Kip S. Thorne. As a PhD student, Caves received the Richard P. Feynman Fellowship in 1976–77 and was the first recipient of the Öcsi Bácsi "Deeply Dedicated to Physics" Award in 1976.

== Career ==
After receiving his PhD, Caves continued at Caltech as a research fellow in physics (1979–81) and then as senior research fellow in theoretical physics (1982–87). During 1987–92 he was associate professor of electrical engineering (and physics from 1989) at the University of Southern California. He moved to Albuquerque in 1992 to become a professor of physics and astronomy at the University of New Mexico (UNM). In 2006 he was promoted to distinguished professor, UNM's highest faculty rank. In 2009 he was appointed the inaugural director of the Center for Quantum Information and Control (CQuIC), an interdisciplinary center at UNM and the University of Arizona, which investigates and develops a new generation of technologies for controlling the behavior of quantum systems. He retired from teaching and administration in 2018 and continues research as a research professor of physics and astronomy at UNM.

Caves is best known for his proposal in 1981 that squeezed light injected into the vacuum port of an interferometer can improve the interferometer's sensitivity for detecting small phase changes. This proposal prompted thirty years of technology development to design squeezed-light sources that can improve the exquisite sensitivity achieved by the very large interferometers that have been constructed to detect gravitational waves from astrophysical events. The squeezed-light technique was installed in the LIGO and Virgo interferometric gravitational-wave detectors for the observing run that began in April 2019 and made a measurable improvement in the detectors' sensitivity.

Caves has made seminal contributions to the theory of continuous measurements in quantum mechanics and to the formulation of quantum-Fisher bounds on the sensitivity of high-precision measurements. He participated in initial work on what is now called Quantum Bayesianism, worked on a proposal for doing two-qubit quantum gates on neutral atoms trapped in an optical lattice, helped to clarify the role of quantum entanglement in Nuclear Magnetic Resonance (NMR) simulations of quantum computation, and explored the role of nonclassical correlations outside of quantum entanglement as the resource that powers quantum computation.

The infamous quote "Hilbert space is a big place!" is attributed to Caves in a paper on quantum information.

Caves is the author of over 140 scientific papers on these and other topics. His present research is concentrated on quantum metrology, quantum control, and quantum information science.

In addition to his interest in quantum physics, Caves has also criticized J. Richard Gott's use of a temporal Copernican principle to predict the future duration of a phenomenon based only knowing the phenomenon's present age.

== Family and other interests ==
Caves has two siblings, Douglas W. Caves of Madison, Wisconsin, and Linda L. Archer of Greensboro, North Carolina. Caves married Karen L. Kahn on 3 June 1984. They reside in Albuquerque, where Kahn is a partner at the law firm of Modrall Sperling. They have two children: Jeremy Caves Rugenstein, an assistant professor in the department of geosciences at Colorado State University, and Eleanor Caves, currently a Marie Skłodowska-Curie Fellow at the University of Exeter and, beginning August 2022, an assistant professor in the department of ecology, evolution, and marine biology at the University of California, Santa Barbara. In addition to his scientific interests, Caves is an avid bird-watcher and an ardent environmentalist. He was formerly a member of the board of Audubon, New Mexico, and chair of the board's conservation committee.

== Awards and honors ==
- 1972–75 — National Science Foundation (NSF) Predoctoral Fellow
- 1976–77 — Richard P. Feynman Fellowship (as a PhD student)
- 1976 — inaugural recipient of the Öcsi Bácsi "Deeply Dedicated to Physics" Award
- 1990 — (with Daniel Walls) Einstein Prize for Laser Science from the Society for Optical and Quantum Electronics
- 2004 — elected a Fellow of the American Physical Society
- 2008 — elected a Fellow of the American Association for the Advancement of Science
- 2011 — Max Born Award from the Optical Society of America
- 2018 — Quantum Communication Award, International Conference on Quantum Communication, Measurement and Computing (QCMC)
- 2020 — elected a member of the National Academy of Sciences
- 2020 — Micius Quantum Prize for "his foundational work on quantum metrology and quantum information theory, especially for elucidating the fundamental noise in interferometers and its suppression with the use of squeezed states."

== See also ==
- Quantum Aspects of Life
