= Mutually unbiased bases =

Concept in quantum information theory

An example of three bases in a two-dimensional space, where bases B1 and B2 are mutually unbiased, whereas the vectors of basis B3 do not have equal overlap with the vectors of basis B1 (as well as B2) and so B3 is not mutually unbiased with B1 (and B2).

In quantum information theory, a set of bases in Hilbert space C^{d} are said to be mutually unbiased if when a system is prepared in an eigenstate of one of the bases, then all outcomes of the measurement with respect to the other basis are predicted to occur with an equal probability of 1/d.

== Overview ==
The notion of mutually unbiased bases was first introduced by Julian Schwinger in 1960, and the first person to consider applications of mutually unbiased bases was I. D. Ivanovic in the problem of quantum state determination.

Mutually unbiased bases (MUBs) and their existence problem is now known to have several closely related problems and equivalent avatars in several other branches of mathematics and quantum sciences, such as SIC-POVMs, finite projective/affine planes, complex Hadamard matrices and more [see section: Related problems].

MUBs are important for quantum key distribution, more specifically in secure quantum key exchange. MUBs are used in many protocols since the outcome is random when a measurement is made in a basis unbiased to that in which the state was prepared. When two remote parties share two non-orthogonal quantum states, attempts by an eavesdropper to distinguish between these by measurements will affect the system and this can be detected. While many quantum cryptography protocols have relied on 1-qubit technologies, employing higher-dimensional states, such as qutrits, allows for better security against eavesdropping. This motivates the study of mutually unbiased bases in higher-dimensional spaces.

Other uses of mutually unbiased bases include quantum state reconstruction, quantum error correction codes, detection of quantum entanglement, and the so-called "mean king's problem".

== Definition and examples ==
A pair of orthonormal bases $\{|e_1\rangle, \dots, |e_d\rangle\}$ and $\{|f_1\rangle, \dots, |f_d\rangle\}$ in Hilbert space C^{d} are said to be mutually unbiased, if and only if the square of the magnitude of the inner product between any basis states $|e_j\rangle$ and $|f_k\rangle$ equals the inverse of the dimension d:

$$|\langle e_j|f_k \rangle|^2 = \frac{1}{d}, \quad \forall j,k \in \{1, \dots, d\}.$$

These bases are unbiased in the following sense: if a system is prepared in a state belonging to one of the bases, then all outcomes of the measurement with respect to the other basis are predicted to occur with equal probability.

=== Example for d = 2 ===
The three bases

$$M_0 =  \left\{ | 0 \rangle,| 1 \rangle \right\}$$
$$M_1 = \left\{ \frac{| 0 \rangle+| 1 \rangle}{\sqrt{2}},\frac{| 0 \rangle-| 1 \rangle}{\sqrt{2}} \right\}$$
$$M_2 = \left\{ \frac{| 0 \rangle+i | 1 \rangle}{\sqrt{2}},\frac{| 0 \rangle-i| 1 \rangle}{\sqrt{2}} \right\}$$

provide the simplest example of mutually unbiased bases in C^{2}. The above bases are composed of the eigenvectors of the Pauli spin matrices $\sigma_z, \sigma_x$ and their product $\sigma_x \sigma_z$, respectively.

=== Example for d = 4 ===
For d = 4, an example of d + 1 = 5 mutually unbiased bases where each basis is denoted by M_{j}, 0 ≤ j ≤ 4, is given as follows:

$$M_0 = \left\{(1,0,0,0),(0,1,0,0),(0,0,1,0),(0,0,0,1)\right\}$$
$$M_1 = \left\{\frac{1}{2}(1,1,1,1),\frac{1}{2}(1,1,-1,-1),\frac{1}{2}(1,-1,-1,1),\frac{1}{2}(1,-1,1,-1)\right\}$$
$$M_2 = \left\{\frac{1}{2}(1,-1,-i,-i),\frac{1}{2}(1,-1,i,i),\frac{1}{2}(1,1,i,-i),\frac{1}{2}(1,1,-i,i)\right\}$$
$$M_3 = \left\{\frac{1}{2}(1,-i,-i, -1),\frac{1}{2}(1,-i,i,1),\frac{1}{2}(1,i,i,-1),\frac{1}{2}(1,i,-i,1)\right\}$$
$$M_4 = \left\{\frac{1}{2}(1,-i,-1,-i),\frac{1}{2}(1,-i,1,i),\frac{1}{2}(1,i,-1,i),\frac{1}{2}(1,i,1,-i)\right\}$$

== Existence problem ==
Unsolved problem in mathematics
What is the maximum number of MUBs in any given non-prime-power dimension d?
More unsolved problems in mathematics

Let $\mathfrak{M}(d)$ denote the maximum number of mutually unbiased bases in the d-dimensional Hilbert space C^{d}. It is an open question how many mutually unbiased bases, $\mathfrak{M}(d)$, one can find in C^{d}, for arbitrary d.

In general, if

$$d = p_1^{n_1} p_2^{n_2} \cdots p_k^{n_k}$$

is the prime-power factorization of d, where

$$p_1^{n_1} < p_2^{n_2}<\cdots<p_k^{n_k}$$

then the maximum number of mutually unbiased bases which can be constructed satisfies

$$p_1^{n_1}+1 \le \mathfrak{M}(d) \le d+1.$$

It follows that if the dimension of a Hilbert space d is an integer power of a prime number, then it is possible to find d + 1 mutually unbiased bases. This can be seen in the previous equation, as the prime number decomposition of d simply is $d = p^{n}$. Therefore,

$$\mathfrak{M}(p^n) = p^n + 1.$$

Thus, the maximum number of mutually unbiased bases is known when d is an integer power of a prime number, but it is not known for arbitrary d.

The smallest dimension that is not an integer power of a prime is d = 6. This is also the smallest dimension for which the number of mutually unbiased bases is not known. The methods used to determine the number of mutually unbiased bases when d is an integer power of a prime number cannot be used in this case. Searches for a set of four mutually unbiased bases when d = 6, both by using Hadamard matrices and numerical methods have been unsuccessful. The general belief is that the maximum number of mutually unbiased bases for d = 6 is $\mathfrak{M}(6) = 3$.

== Related problems ==
Unsolved problem in mathematics
Do SIC-POVMs exist in all dimensions?
More unsolved problems in mathematics

The MUBs problem seems similar in nature to the symmetric property of SIC-POVMs. William Wootters points out that a complete set of $d+1$ unbiased bases yields a geometric structure known as a finite projective plane, while a SIC-POVM (in any dimension that is a prime power) yields a finite affine plane, a type of structure whose definition is identical to that of a finite projective plane with the roles of points and lines exchanged. In this sense, the problems of SIC-POVMs and of mutually unbiased bases are dual to one another.

In dimension $d = 3$, the analogy can be taken further: a complete set of mutually unbiased bases can be directly constructed from a SIC-POVM. The 9 vectors of the SIC-POVM, together with the 12 vectors of the mutually unbiased bases, form a set that can be used in a Kochen–Specker proof. However, in 6-dimensional Hilbert space, a SIC-POVM is known, but no complete set of mutually unbiased bases has yet been discovered, and it is widely believed that no such set exists.

== Search methods ==
=== Weyl group method ===
Let $\hat{X}$ and $\hat{Z}$ be two unitary operators in the Hilbert space C^{d} such that

$$\hat{Z}\hat{X} = \omega\hat{X}\hat{Z}$$

for some phase factor $\omega$. If $\omega$ is a primitive root of unity, for example $\omega \equiv e^{\frac{2 \pi i}{d}}$ then the eigenbases of $\hat{X}$ and $\hat{Z}$ are mutually unbiased.

By choosing the eigenbasis of $\hat{Z}$ to be the standard basis, we can generate another basis unbiased to it using a Fourier matrix. The elements of the Fourier matrix are given by

$$F_{ab} = \omega^{ab}, 0 \le a,b \le N-1$$

Other bases which are unbiased to both the standard basis and the basis generated by the Fourier matrix can be generated using Weyl groups. The dimension of the Hilbert space is important when generating sets of mutually unbiased bases using Weyl groups. When d is a prime number, then the usual d + 1 mutually unbiased bases can be generated using Weyl groups. When d is not a prime number, then it is possible that the maximal number of mutually unbiased bases which can be generated using this method is 3.

=== Unitary operators method using finite fields ===
When d = p is prime, we define the unitary operators $\hat{X}$ and $\hat{Z}$ by

$$\hat{X} = \sum_{k=0}^{d-1} |k+1 \rangle \langle k|$$
$$\hat{Z} = \sum_{k=0}^{d-1} \omega^k |k \rangle \langle k|$$

where $\{ |k \rangle | 0 \le k \le d-1 \}$ is the standard basis and $\omega = e^{\frac{2\pi i}{d}}$ is a root of unity.

Then the eigenbases of the following d + 1 operators are mutually unbiased:

$$\hat{X}, \hat{Z}, \hat{X} \hat{Z}, \hat{X} \hat{Z}^2, \ldots, \hat{X} \hat{Z}^{d-1}.$$

For odd d, the t-th eigenvector of the operator $\hat{X}\hat{Z}^{k}$ is given explicitly by

$$|\psi^k_t \rangle = \frac{1}{\sqrt d}\sum_{j=0}^{d-1}\omega^{tj + kj^2}|j\rangle .$$

When $d=p^r$ is a power of a prime, we make use of the finite field $\mathbb{F}_d$ to construct a maximal set of d + 1 mutually unbiased bases. We label the elements of the computational basis of C^{d} using the finite field: $\{ |a \rangle | a \in \mathbb{F}_d \}$.

We define the operators $\hat{X_a}$ and $\hat{Z_b}$ in the following way

$$\hat{X_a} = \sum_{c \in \mathbb{F}_d} |c + a \rangle \langle c|$$
$$\hat{Z_b} = \sum_{c \in \mathbb{F}_d} \chi (bc)|c \rangle \langle c|$$

where

$$\chi(\theta) = \exp \left [ \frac{2\pi i }{p} \left ( \theta+ \theta^p + \theta^{p^2}+ \cdots + \theta^{p^{r-1}} \right ) \right ],$$

is an additive character over the field and the addition and multiplication in the kets and $\chi(\cdot)$ is that of $\mathbb{F}_d$.

Then we form d + 1 sets of commuting unitary operators:

$\{ \hat{Z_s} | s \in \mathbb{F}_d \}$ and $\{ \hat{X_s}\hat{Z_{sr}} | s \in \mathbb{F}_d \}$ for each $r \in \mathbb{F}_d$

The joint eigenbases of the operators in one set are mutually unbiased to that of any other set. We thus have d + 1 mutually unbiased bases.

=== Hadamard matrix method ===
Given that one basis in a Hilbert space is the standard basis, then all bases which are unbiased with respect to this basis can be represented by the columns of a complex Hadamard matrix multiplied by a normalization factor. For d = 3 these matrices would have the form

$$U = \frac{1}{\sqrt{d}}
\begin{bmatrix}
1 & 1 & 1 \\
e^{i \phi_{10}} & e^{i \phi_{11}} & e^{i \phi_{12}} \\
e^{i \phi_{20}} & e^{i \phi_{21}} & e^{i \phi_{22}}
\end{bmatrix}$$

The problem of finding a set of k+1 mutually unbiased bases therefore corresponds to finding k mutually unbiased complex Hadamard matrices.

An example of a one parameter family of Hadamard matrices in a 4-dimensional Hilbert space is

$$H_4(\phi) = \frac{1}{2}
\begin{bmatrix}
1 & 1 & 1 & 1 \\
1 & e^{i\phi} & -1 & -e^{i \phi} \\
1 & -1 & 1 & -1 \\
1 & -e^{i\phi} & -1 & e^{i\phi}
\end{bmatrix}$$

== Entropic uncertainty relations ==
There is an alternative characterization of mutually unbiased bases that considers them in terms of uncertainty relations.

Entropic uncertainty relations are analogous to the Heisenberg uncertainty principle, and Hans Maassen and J. B. M. Uffink found that for any two bases $B_1 = \{ |a_{i}\rangle_{i=1}^d \}$ and $B_2 = \{ | b_{j} \rangle _{j=1}^{d} \}$:

$$H_{B_1} + H_{B_2} \geq -2\log c.$$

where $c = \max | \langle a_j | b_k \rangle |$ and $H_{B_1}$ and $H_{B_2}$ is the respective entropy of the bases $B_1$ and $B_2$, when measuring a given state.

Entropic uncertainty relations are often preferable to the Heisenberg uncertainty principle, as they are not phrased in terms of the state to be measured, but in terms of c.

In scenarios such as quantum key distribution, we aim for measurement bases such that full knowledge of a state with respect to one basis implies minimal knowledge of the state with respect to the other bases. This implies a high entropy of measurement outcomes, and thus we call these strong entropic uncertainty relations.

For two bases, the lower bound of the uncertainty relation is maximized when the measurement bases are mutually unbiased, since mutually unbiased bases are maximally incompatible: the outcome of a measurement made in a basis unbiased to that in which the state is prepared in is completely random. In fact, for a d-dimensional space, we have:

$$H_{B_1} + H_{B_2} \geq \log (d)$$

for any pair of mutually unbiased bases $B_1$ and $B_2$. This bound is optimal: If we measure a state from one of the bases then the outcome has entropy 0 in that basis and an entropy of $\log(d)$ in the other.

If the dimension of the space is a prime power, we can construct d + 1 MUBs, and then it has been found that

$$\sum_{k=1}^{d+1} H_{B_k} \geq (d+1) \log\left(\frac{d+1}{2} \right)$$

which is stronger than the relation we would get from pairing up the sets and then using the Maassen and Uffink equation. Thus we have a characterization of d + 1 mutually unbiased bases as those for which the uncertainty relations are strongest.

Although the case for two bases, and for d + 1 bases is well studied, very little is known about uncertainty relations for mutually unbiased bases in other circumstances.

When considering more than two, and less than $d+1$ bases it is known that large sets of mutually unbiased bases exist which exhibit very little uncertainty. This means merely being mutually unbiased does not lead to high uncertainty, except when considering measurements in only two bases. Yet there do exist other measurements that are very uncertain.

== Infinite dimension Hilbert spaces ==
While there has been investigation into mutually unbiased bases in infinite dimension Hilbert space, their existence remains an open question. It is conjectured that in a continuous Hilbert space, two orthonormal bases $|\psi_s^b \rangle$ and $|\psi_{s'}^{b'} \rangle$ are said to be mutually unbiased if

$$|\langle \psi_s^b | \psi_{s'}^{b'}  \rangle|^2 = k>0, s,s'\in \mathbb{R}$$

For the generalized position and momentum eigenstates $| q \rangle, q\in \mathbb{R}$ and $| p \rangle,p\in \mathbb{R}$, the value of k is

$$|\langle q | p  \rangle|^2 = \frac{1}{2 \pi \hbar}$$

The existence of mutually unbiased bases in a continuous Hilbert space remains open for debate, as further research in their existence is required before any conclusions can be reached.

Position states $| q \rangle$ and momentum states $| p \rangle$ are eigenvectors of Hermitian operators $\hat{x}$ and $-i \frac{\partial}{\partial x}$, respectively. Weigert and Wilkinson were first to notice that also a linear combination of these operators have eigenbases, which have some features typical for the mutually unbiased bases. An operator $\alpha \hat{x}-i\beta\frac{\partial}{\partial x}$ has eigenfunctions proportional to $\exp(i(ax^2+bx)) \,$ with $\alpha+2\beta a=0$ and the corresponding eigenvalues $b\beta$. If we parametrize $\alpha$ and $\beta$ as $\cos \theta$ and $\sin \theta$, the overlap between any eigenstate of the linear combination and any eigenstate of the position operator (both states normalized to the Dirac delta) is constant, but dependent on $\beta$:

$$|\langle x_\theta|x \rangle |^2=\frac{1}{2\pi|\sin\theta|},$$

where $|x\rangle$ and $|x_\theta\rangle$ stand for eigenfunctions of $\hat{x}$ and $\cos\theta\hat{x}-i \sin \theta \frac{\partial}{\partial x}$.

== See also ==
- Measurement in quantum mechanics
- POVM
- SIC-POVM
- QBism
