= Sergio Boixo =

Spanish physicist

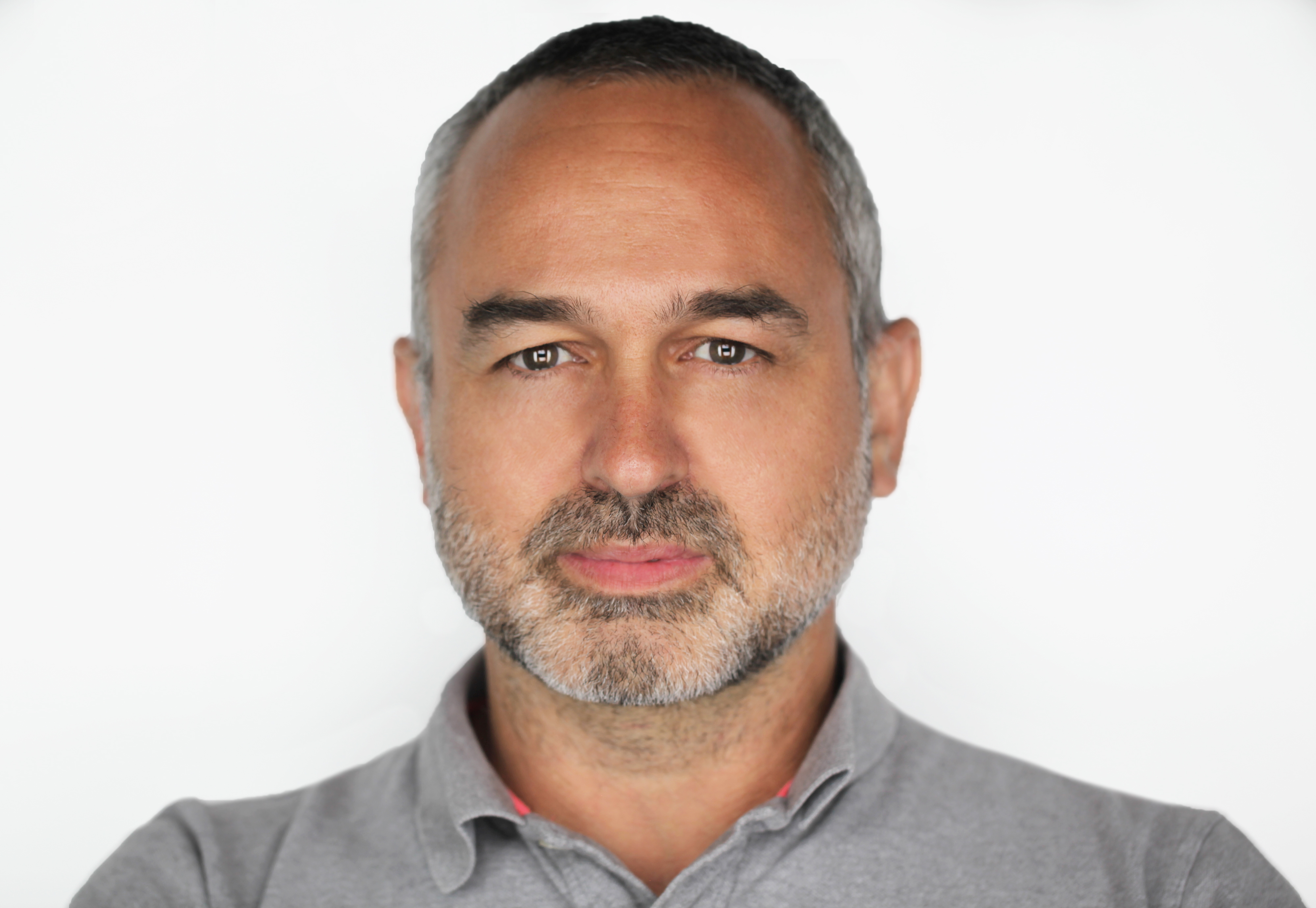
- Born: April 2, 1973 (age 53); León, Spain
- Education: Complutense University of Madrid, UNED, UAB, University of New Mexico
- Known for: Demonstrating quantum supremacy
- Scientific career
- Fields: Quantum physics, quantum computing
- Workplaces: Los Alamos National Laboratory, Caltech, Harvard, USC, Google
- Thesis: Nonlinear quantum metrology (2008)
- Doctoral advisor: Carlton M. Caves

Sergio Boixo has degrees in computer engineering, philosophy, mathematics, and master and PhD in physics, and is best known for his work on quantum computing. He is currently working as Director of Quantum Computing for Google's Quantum Artificial Intelligence Lab, a team he joined in 2013, shortly after its foundation.

Boixo is a Fellow of the American Physical Society and a corresponding academician of the Royal Academy of Engineering. In 2026, he was awarded an honoris causa doctorate by Universida de León.

== Education years ==
Boixo began his university education with a computer engineering degree at the newly instituted Faculty of Computer Science (Complutense University of Madrid) from 1993 to 1996. He got the best qualifications in that first promotion, being awarded with the Chip de Oro prize for his academic achievements. In the meantime, he also took degrees both in philosophy (2002) and mathematics (2003) at the National University of Distance Education (UNED).

After a traineeship at the European Central Bank as a C++ developer (Frankfurt, 1999), he continued his professional career as a computer engineer in the German banking sector, system architect for Semanticedge, and software consultant and analyst for several international companies.

He then focused on his academic career, with a specialisation in physics. In 2004 he was awarded with a LaCaixa fellowship to specialise in the University of New Mexico and Los Alamos National Laboratory. In 2008 he was also awarded a scholarship by the Mutua Madrileña Foundation. He completed a master's degree in physics in the Autonomous University of Barcelona in 2008 and published some of his first research focusing on quantum annealing. He received his PhD in physics from the University of New Mexico in 2008, under the supervision of Carlton M. Caves for his thesis on nonlinear quantum metrology. Part of the theory developed on this thesis was later implemented in an optical experiment.

== Research in Quantum Computing ==
His postdoctoral research began at the California Institute of Technology (Caltech) with John Preskill, who had coined the term "quantum advantage (supremacy)" which Boixo's Quantum Artificial Intelligence Lab would later demonstrate. There he specialised in quantum information and quantum computing, topics in which he continued his postdoctoral research at Harvard. In 2011, he moved to the University of Southern California, where he focused his research on quantum computing and began working on the first-ever commercial quantum processor for the Quantum Artificial Intelligence Lab, a joint initiative of NASA, Universities Space Research Association, and Google.

He joined Google's quantum computing team in 2013. This team has focused on topics such as quantum simulation, quantum neural networks and quantum metrology. In 2019 they published the landmark paper demonstrating they had achieved quantum advantage (supremacy), completing with a quantum computer in just three minutes a task that would take 10000 years to be done by the world's most powerful classical supercomputer. Boixo played the leading role on the development of the theory backing that experiment.

== TV and video appearances ==
- He was the main guest in an episode of the Spanish TV show Planeta Calleja.
- He made an informative video for TensorFlow's YouTube channel explaining what quantum supremacy is.
- Beyond Classical Quantum Computing Sergio Boixo, QSRT, May 25, 2021

== See also ==
- Quantum supremacy
- Quantum computing
- Adiabatic quantum computation
- D-Wave Systems
- Quantum discord
- Sycamore processor
- John M. Martinis
- Hartmut Neven
