= Identity channel =

In quantum information theory, the identity channel is a noise-free quantum channel. That is, the channel outputs exactly what was put in.

The identity channel is commonly denoted as $I$, $\mathsf{id}$ or $\mathbb{I}$.
