= Quantum network =

Networks connecting quantum processors

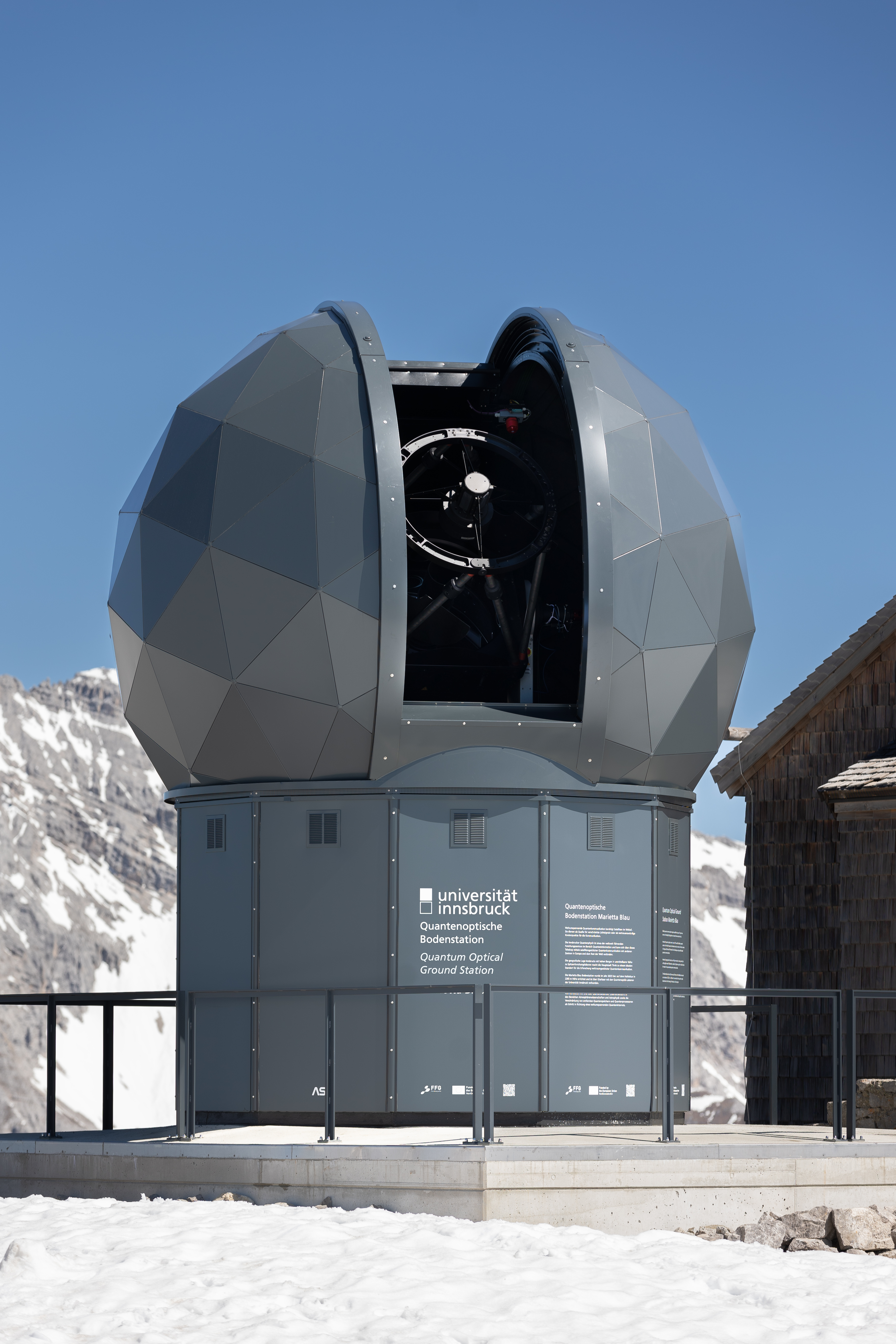
A Quantum Optical Ground Station located on the Hafelekar mountain at an altitude of 2,280 m and operated by the University of Innsbruck.

Quantum networks form an important element of quantum computing and quantum communication systems. Quantum networks facilitate the transmission of information in the form of quantum bits, also called qubits, between physically separated quantum processors. A quantum processor is a machine able to perform quantum circuits on a certain number of qubits. Quantum networks work in a similar way to classical networks. The main difference is that quantum networking, like quantum computing, is better at solving certain problems, such as modeling quantum systems.

== Basics ==
=== Computation ===
Networked quantum computing or distributed quantum computing works by linking multiple quantum processors through a quantum network by sending qubits in between them. Doing this creates a quantum computing cluster and therefore creates more computing potential. Less powerful computers can be linked in this way to create one more powerful processor. This is analogous to connecting several classical computers to form a computer cluster in classical computing. Like classical computing, this system is scalable by adding more and more quantum computers to the network. Currently quantum processors are only separated by short distances.

=== Communication ===
In the realm of quantum communication, one wants to send qubits from one quantum processor to another over long distances. This way, local quantum networks can be intra connected into a quantum internet. A quantum internet supports many applications, which derive their power from the fact that by creating quantum entangled qubits, information can be transmitted between the remote quantum processors. Most applications of a quantum internet require only very modest quantum processors. For most quantum internet protocols, such as quantum key distribution in quantum cryptography, it is sufficient if these processors are capable of preparing and measuring only a single qubit at a time. This is in contrast to quantum computing where interesting applications can be realized only if the (combined) quantum processors can easily simulate more qubits than a classical computer (around 60). Quantum internet applications require only small quantum processors, often just a single qubit, because quantum entanglement can already be realized between just two qubits. A simulation of an entangled quantum system on a classical computer cannot simultaneously provide the same security and speed.

=== Overview of the elements ===
The basic structure of a quantum network and more generally a quantum internet is analogous to a classical network. First, we have end nodes on which applications are ultimately run. These end nodes are quantum processors of at least one qubit. Some applications of a quantum internet require quantum processors of several qubits as well as a quantum memory at the end nodes.

Second, to transport qubits from one node to another, we need communication lines. For the purpose of quantum communication, standard telecom fibers can be used. For networked quantum computing, in which quantum processors are linked at short distances, different wavelengths are chosen depending on the exact hardware platform of the quantum processor.

Third, to make maximum use of communication infrastructure, one requires optical switches capable of delivering qubits to the intended quantum processor. These switches need to preserve quantum coherence, which makes them more challenging to realize than standard optical switches.

Finally, one requires a quantum repeater to transport qubits over long distances. Repeaters appear in between end nodes. Since qubits cannot be copied (No-cloning theorem), classical signal amplification is not possible. By necessity, a quantum repeater works in a fundamentally different way than a classical repeater.

== Elements ==
=== End nodes: quantum processors ===
End nodes can both receive and emit information. Telecommunication lasers and parametric down-conversion combined with photodetectors can be used for quantum key distribution. In this case, the end nodes can in many cases be very simple devices consisting only of beamsplitters and photodetectors.

However, for many protocols more sophisticated end nodes are desirable. These systems provide advanced processing capabilities and can also be used as quantum repeaters. Their chief advantage is that they can store and retransmit quantum information without disrupting the underlying quantum state. The quantum state being stored can either be the relative spin of an electron in a magnetic field or the energy state of an electron. They can also perform quantum logic gates.

One way of realizing such end nodes is by using color centers in diamond, such as the nitrogen-vacancy center. This system forms a small quantum processor featuring several qubits. NV centers can be utilized at room temperatures. Small scale quantum algorithms and quantum error correction has already been demonstrated in this system, as well as the ability to entangle two and three quantum processors, and perform deterministic quantum teleportation.

Another possible platform are quantum processors based on ion traps, which utilize radio-frequency magnetic fields and lasers. In a multispecies trapped-ion node network, photons entangled with a parent atom are used to entangle different nodes. Also, cavity quantum electrodynamics (Cavity QED) is one possible method of doing this. In Cavity QED, photonic quantum states can be transferred to and from atomic quantum states stored in single atoms contained in optical cavities. This allows for the transfer of quantum states between single atoms using optical fiber in addition to the creation of remote entanglement between distant atoms.

=== Communication lines: physical layer ===
Over long distances, the primary method of operating quantum networks is to use optical networks and photon-based qubits. This is due to optical networks having a reduced chance of decoherence. Optical networks have the advantage of being able to re-use existing optical fiber. Alternately, free space networks can be implemented that transmit quantum information through the atmosphere or through a vacuum.

==== Fiber optic networks ====
Optical networks using existing telecommunication fiber can be implemented using hardware similar to existing telecommunication equipment. This fiber can be either single-mode or multi-mode, with single-mode allowing for more precise communication. At the sender, a single photon source can be created by heavily attenuating a standard telecommunication laser such that the mean number of photons per pulse is less than 1. For receiving, an avalanche photodetector can be used. Various methods of phase or polarization control can be used such as interferometers and beam splitters. In the case of entanglement based protocols, entangled photons can be generated through spontaneous parametric down-conversion. In both cases, the telecom fiber can be multiplexed to send non-quantum timing and control signals.

In 2020 a team of researchers affiliated with several institutions in China has succeeded in sending entangled quantum memories over a 50-kilometer coiled fiber cable.

==== Free space networks ====
Free space quantum networks operate similar to fiber optic networks but rely on line of sight between the communicating parties instead of using a fiber optic connection. Free space networks can typically support higher transmission rates than fiber optic networks and do not have to account for polarization scrambling caused by optical fiber. However, over long distances, free space communication is subject to an increased chance of environmental disturbance on the photons.

Free space communication is also possible from a satellite to the ground. A quantum satellite capable of entanglement distribution over a distance of 1,203 km has been demonstrated. The experimental exchange of single photons from a global navigation satellite system at a slant distance of 20,000 km has also been reported. These satellites can play an important role in linking smaller ground-based networks over larger distances. In free-space networks, atmospheric conditions such as turbulence, scattering, and absorption present challenges that affect the fidelity of transmitted quantum states. To mitigate these effects, researchers employ adaptive optics, advanced modulation schemes, and error correction techniques. The resilience of QKD protocols against eavesdropping plays a crucial role in ensuring the security of the transmitted data. Specifically, protocols like BB84 and decoy-state schemes have been adapted for free-space environments to improve robustness against potential security vulnerabilities.

=== Repeaters ===
Long-distance communication is hindered by the effects of signal loss and decoherence inherent to most transport mediums such as optical fiber. In classical communication, amplifiers can be used to boost the signal during transmission, but in a quantum network amplifiers cannot be used since qubits cannot be copied – known as the no-cloning theorem. That is, to implement an amplifier, the complete state of the flying qubit would need to be determined, something which is both unwanted and impossible.

==== Trusted repeaters ====
An intermediary step which allows the testing of communication infrastructure are trusted repeaters. Importantly, a trusted repeater cannot be used to transmit qubits over long distances. Instead, a trusted repeater can only be used to perform quantum key distribution with the additional assumption that the repeater is trusted. Consider two end nodes A and B, and a trusted repeater R in the middle. A and R now perform quantum key distribution to generate a key $k_{AR}$. Similarly, R and B run quantum key distribution to generate a key $k_{RB}$. A and B can now obtain a key $k_{AB}$ between themselves as follows: A sends $k_{AB}$ to R encrypted with the key $k_{AR}$. R decrypts to obtain $k_{AB}$. R then re-encrypts $k_{AB}$ using the key $k_{RB}$ and sends it to B. B decrypts to obtain $k_{AB}$. A and B now share the key $k_{AB}$. The key is secure from an outside eavesdropper, but clearly the repeater R also knows $k_{AB}$. This means that any subsequent communication between A and B does not provide end to end security, but is only secure as long as A and B trust the repeater R.

==== Quantum repeaters ====
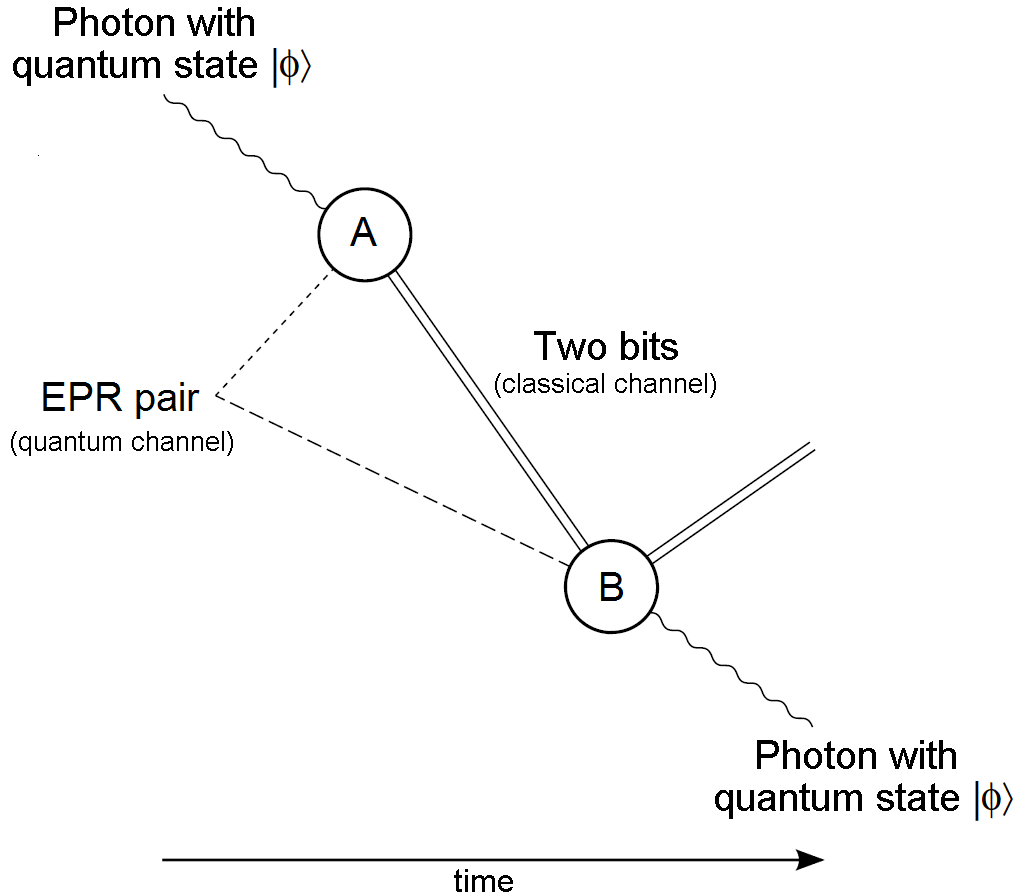
Diagram for quantum teleportation of a photon

A true quantum repeater allows the end to end generation of quantum entanglement, and thus – by using quantum teleportation – the end to end transmission of qubits. In quantum key distribution protocols one can test for such entanglement. This means that when making encryption keys, the sender and receiver are secure even if they do not trust the quantum repeater. Any other application of a quantum internet also requires the end to end transmission of qubits, and thus a quantum repeater.

Quantum repeaters allow entanglement and can be established at distant nodes without physically sending an entangled qubit the entire distance.

In this case, the quantum network consists of many short distance links of perhaps tens or hundreds of kilometers. In the simplest case of a single repeater, two pairs of entangled qubits are established: $|A\rangle$ and $|R_a\rangle$ located at the sender and the repeater, and a second pair $|R_b\rangle$ and $|B\rangle$ located at the repeater and the receiver. These initial entangled qubits can be easily created, for example through parametric down conversion, with one qubit physically transmitted to an adjacent node. At this point, the repeater can perform a Bell measurement on the qubits $|R_a\rangle$ and $|R_b\rangle$ thus teleporting the quantum state of $|R_a\rangle$ onto $|B\rangle$. This has the effect of "swapping" the entanglement such that $|A\rangle$ and $|B\rangle$ are now entangled at a distance twice that of the initial entangled pairs. It can be seen that a network of such repeaters can be used linearly or in a hierarchical fashion to establish entanglement over great distances.

Hardware platforms suitable as end nodes above can also function as quantum repeaters. However, there are also hardware platforms specific only to the task of acting as a repeater, without the capabilities of performing quantum gates.

==== Error correction ====
Error correction can be used in quantum repeaters. Due to technological limitations, however, the applicability is limited to very short distances as quantum error correction schemes capable of protecting qubits over long distances would require an extremely large amount of qubits and hence extremely large quantum computers.

Errors in communication can be broadly classified into two types: Loss errors (due to optical fiber/environment) and operation errors (such as depolarization, dephasing etc.). While redundancy can be used to detect and correct classical errors, redundant qubits cannot be created due to the no-cloning theorem. As a result, other types of error correction must be introduced such as the Shor code or one of a number of more general and efficient codes. All of these codes work by distributing the quantum information across multiple entangled qubits so that operation errors as well as loss errors can be corrected.

In addition to quantum error correction, classical error correction can be employed by quantum networks in special cases such as quantum key distribution. In these cases, the goal of the quantum communication is to securely transmit a string of classical bits. Traditional error correction codes such as Hamming codes can be applied to the bit string before encoding and transmission on the quantum network.

==== Entanglement purification ====
Quantum decoherence can occur when one qubit from a maximally entangled bell state is transmitted across a quantum network. Entanglement purification allows for the creation of nearly maximally entangled qubits from a large number of arbitrary weakly entangled qubits, and thus provides additional protection against errors. Entanglement purification (also known as Entanglement distillation) has already been demonstrated in Nitrogen-vacancy centers in diamond.

== Applications ==
A quantum internet supports numerous applications, enabled by quantum entanglement. In general, quantum entanglement is well suited for tasks that require coordination, synchronization or privacy.

Examples of such applications include quantum key distribution, clock stabilization, protocols for distributed system problems such as leader election or Byzantine agreement, extending the baseline of telescopes, as well as position verification, secure identification and two-party cryptography in the noisy-storage model. A quantum internet also enables secure access to a quantum computer in the cloud. Specifically, a quantum internet enables very simple quantum devices to connect to a remote quantum computer in such a way that computations can be performed there without the quantum computer finding out what this computation actually is (the input and output quantum states can not be measured without destroying the computation, but the circuit composition used for the calculation will be known).

=== Secure communications ===
When it comes to communicating in any form the largest issue has always been keeping these communications private. Quantum networks would allow for information to be created, stored and transmitted, potentially achieving "a level of privacy, security and computational clout that is impossible to achieve with today's Internet."

By applying a quantum operator that the user selects to a system of information the information can then be sent to the receiver without a chance of an eavesdropper being able to accurately be able to record the sent information without either the sender or receiver knowing. Unlike classical information that is transmitted in bits and assigned either a 0 or 1 value, the quantum information used in quantum networks uses quantum bits (qubits), which can have both 0 and 1 value at the same time, being in a state of superposition. This works because if a listener tries to listen in then they will change the information in an unintended way by listening, thereby tipping their hand to the people on whom they are attacking. Secondly, without the proper quantum operator to decode the information they will corrupt the sent information without being able to use it themselves. Furthermore, qubits can be encoded in a variety of materials, including in the polarization of photons or the spin states of electrons.

== Current status ==
=== Quantum internet ===
One example of a prototype quantum communication network is the eight-user city-scale quantum network described in a paper published in September 2020. The network located in Bristol used already deployed fibre-infrastructure and worked without active switching or trusted nodes.

In 2022, Researchers at the University of Science and Technology of China and Jinan Institute of Quantum Technology demonstrated quantum entanglement between two memory devices located at 12.5 km apart from each other within an urban environment.

In the same year, Physicist at the Delft University of Technology in Netherlands has taken a significant step toward the network of the future by using a technique called quantum teleportation that sends data to three physical locations which was previously only possible with two locations.

In 2024, researchers in the U.K and Germany achieved a first by producing, storing, and retrieving quantum information. This milestone involved interfacing a quantum dot light source and a quantum memory system, paving the way for practical applications despite challenges like quantum information loss over long distances.

In February 2025, researchers from Oxford University experimentally demonstrated the distribution of quantum computations between two photonically interconnected trapped-ion modules. Each module contained dedicated network and circuit qubits, and they were separated by approximately two meters. The team achieved deterministic teleportation of a controlled-Z gate between two circuit qubits located in separate modules, attaining an 86% fidelity. This experiment also marked the first implementation of a distributed quantum algorithm comprising multiple non-local two-qubit gates, specifically Grover's search algorithm, which was executed with a 71% success rate. These advancements represented significant progress toward scalable quantum computing and the development of a quantum internet.

A deterministic teleported CNOT gate between remote solid-state qubit registers based on nitrogen-vacancy centers in diamond has also been demonstrated, extending distributed gate operations to a solid-state platform.

=== Computation ===
In 2021, researchers at the Max Planck Institute of Quantum Optics in Germany reported a first prototype of quantum logic gates for distributed quantum computers.

=== Experimental quantum modems ===
A research team at the Max-Planck-Institute of Quantum Optics in Garching, Germany is finding success in transporting quantum data from flying and stable qubits via infrared spectrum matching. This requires a sophisticated, super-cooled yttrium silicate crystal to sandwich erbium in a mirrored environment to achieve resonance matching of infrared wavelengths found in fiber optic networks. The team successfully demonstrated the device works without data loss.

=== Mobile quantum networks ===
In 2021, researchers in China reported the successful transmission of entangled photons between drones, used as nodes for the development of mobile quantum networks or flexible network extensions. This could be the first work in which entangled particles were sent between two moving devices. Also, it has been researched the application of quantum communications to improve 6G mobile networks for joint detection and data transfer with quantum entanglement, where there are possible advantages such as security and energy efficiency.

=== Quantum key distribution networks ===
Several test networks have been deployed that are tailored to the task of quantum key distribution either at short distances (but connecting many users), or over larger distances by relying on trusted repeaters. These networks do not yet allow for the end to end transmission of qubits or the end to end creation of entanglement between far away nodes.

Major quantum network projects and QKD protocols implemented
Quantum network	Start	BB84	BBM92	E91	DPS	COW
DARPA Quantum Network	2001	Yes	No	No	No	No
SECOCQ QKD network in Vienna	2003	Yes	Yes	No	No	Yes
Tokyo QKD network	2009	Yes	Yes	No	Yes	No
Hierarchical network in Wuhu, China	2009	Yes	No	No	No	No
Geneva area network (SwissQuantum)	2010	Yes	No	No	No	Yes

DARPA Quantum Network
Starting in the early 2000s, DARPA began sponsorship of a quantum network development project with the aim of implementing secure communication. The DARPA Quantum Network became operational within the BBN Technologies laboratory in late 2003 and was expanded further in 2004 to include nodes at Harvard and Boston Universities. The network consists of multiple physical layers including fiber optics supporting phase-modulated lasers and entangled photons as well free-space links.

SECOQC Vienna QKD network
From 2003 to 2008 the Secure Communication based on Quantum Cryptography (SECOQC) project developed a collaborative network between a number of European institutions. The architecture chosen for the SECOQC project is a trusted repeater architecture which consists of point-to-point quantum links between devices where long distance communication is accomplished through the use of repeaters.

Chinese hierarchical network
In May 2009, a hierarchical quantum network was demonstrated in Wuhu, China. The hierarchical network consists of a backbone network of four nodes connecting a number of subnets. The backbone nodes are connected through an optical switching quantum router. Nodes within each subnet are also connected through an optical switch and are connected to the backbone network through a trusted relay.

Geneva area network (SwissQuantum)
The SwissQuantum network developed and tested between 2009 and 2011 linked facilities at CERN with the University of Geneva and hepia in Geneva. The SwissQuantum program focused on transitioning the technologies developed in the SECOQC and other research quantum networks into a production environment. In particular the integration with existing telecommunication networks, and its reliability and robustness.

Tokyo QKD network
In 2010, a number of organizations from Japan and the European Union setup and tested the Tokyo QKD network. The Tokyo network build upon existing QKD technologies and adopted a SECOQC like network architecture. For the first time, one-time-pad encryption was implemented at high enough data rates to support popular end-user application such as secure voice and video conferencing. Previous large-scale QKD networks typically used classical encryption algorithms such as AES for high-rate data transfer and use the quantum-derived keys for low rate data or for regularly re-keying the classical encryption algorithms.

Beijing-Shanghai Trunk Line
In September 2017, a 2000-km quantum key distribution network between Beijing and Shanghai, China, was officially opened. This trunk line will serve as a backbone connecting quantum networks in Beijing, Shanghai, Jinan in Shandong province and Hefei in Anhui province. During the opening ceremony, two employees from the Bank of Communications completed a transaction from Shanghai to Beijing using the network. The State Grid Corporation of China is also developing a managing application for the link. The line uses 32 trusted nodes as repeaters. A quantum telecommunication network has been also put into service in Wuhan, capital of central China's Hubei Province, which will be connected to the trunk. Other similar city quantum networks along the Yangtze River are planned to follow.
In 2021, researchers working on this network of networks reported that they combined over 700 optical fibers with two QKD-ground-to-satellite links using a trusted relay structure for a total distance between nodes of up to ~4,600 km, which makes it Earth's largest integrated quantum communication network.

IQNET
IQNET (Intelligent Quantum Networks and Technologies) was founded in 2017 by Caltech and AT&T. Together, they are collaborating with the Fermi National Accelerator Laboratory, and the Jet Propulsion Laboratory. In December 2020, IQNET published a work in PRX Quantum that reported a successful teleportation of time-bin qubits across 44 km of fiber. For the first time, the published work includes a theoretical modelling of the experimental setup. The two test beds for performed measurements were the Caltech Quantum Network and the Fermilab Quantum Network. This research represents an important step in establishing a quantum internet of the future, which would revolutionise the fields of secure communication, data storage, precision sensing, and computing.

== Pre-standardization efforts ==
Quantum networks have not yet been standardized, but several SDOs have pre-standardization efforts under way.

The Quantum Internet Research Group (QIRG) of the IRTF was founded in November 2018. To date, QIRG has published two RFCs. It was founded to study issues requiring expertise from the Internet community, including routing, resource management, security, and APIs.

The ITU-T Focus Group on Quantum Information Technology for Networks (FG-QIT4N) was founded in September 2019 to study evolution, applications, terminology and use cases for quantum networks.

More broadly, IEEE Standards Association has a set of projects on quantum information technology, some of which touch on quantum networks.

== See also ==
- Quantum mechanics
- Quantum computer
- Quantum bus
