= SIC-POVM =

Type of measurement in quantum mechanics

In the Bloch sphere representation of a qubit, the states of a SIC-POVM form a regular tetrahedron. Zauner conjectured that analogous structures exist in complex Hilbert spaces of all finite dimensions.

In the context of quantum mechanics and quantum information theory, symmetric, informationally complete, positive operator-valued measures (SIC-POVMs) are a particular type of generalized measurement (POVM). SIC-POVMs are particularly notable thanks to their defining features of (1) being informationally complete; (2) having the minimal number of outcomes compatible with informational completeness, and (3) being highly symmetric. In this context, informational completeness is the property of a POVM of allowing to fully reconstruct input states from measurement data.

The properties of SIC-POVMs make them an interesting candidate for a "standard quantum measurement", utilized in the study of foundational quantum mechanics, most notably in QBism. SIC-POVMs have several applications in the context of quantum state tomography and quantum cryptography, and a possible connection has been discovered with Hilbert's twelfth problem.

== Definition ==
Unsolved problem in mathematics
Do SIC-POVMs exist in all dimensions?
More unsolved problems in mathematics

A POVM over a $d$-dimensional Hilbert space $\mathcal{H}$ is a set of $m$ positive-semidefinite operators $\left\{F_i \right\}_{i=1}^m$ that sum to the identity:
$$\sum_{i=1}^m F_i = I.$$

If a POVM consists of at least $d^2$ operators which span the space of self-adjoint operators $\mathcal{L}(\mathcal{H})$, it is said to be an informationally complete POVM (IC-POVM). IC-POVMs consisting of exactly $d^2$ elements are called minimal. A set of $d^2$ rank-1 projectors $\left\{\Pi_i \right\}_{i=1}^{d^2}$ which have equal pairwise Hilbert–Schmidt inner products,
$$\mathrm{Tr}\left( \Pi_i \Pi_j \right) = \frac{d\delta_{ij} + 1}{d + 1},$$
defines a minimal IC-POVM with elements $F_i = \frac{1}{d} \Pi_i$ called a SIC-POVM.

== Properties ==
=== Symmetry ===
Consider an arbitrary set of rank-1 projectors $(\Pi_i)_{i=1}^{d^2}$ such that $F_i=\Pi_i/d$ is a POVM, and thus $\frac{1}{d} \sum_i \Pi_i = I$. Asking the projectors to have equal pairwise inner products, $\mathrm{Tr}(\Pi_i \Pi_j ) = c$ for all $i \neq j$, fixes the value of $c$. To see this, observe that
$$\begin{align}
d &= \mathrm{Tr}(I^2) \\
&= \frac{1}{d^2} \sum_{i,j} \mathrm{Tr}(\Pi_i \Pi_j) \\
&= \frac{1}{d^2} \left( d^2 + c d^2 (d^2-1) \right)
\end{align}$$
implies that $c = \frac{1}{d + 1}$. Thus,
$$\mathrm{Tr}\left( \Pi_i \Pi_j \right) = \frac{d\delta_{ij} + 1}{d + 1}.$$
This property is what makes SIC-POVMs symmetric: Any pair of elements has the same Hilbert–Schmidt inner product as any other pair.

=== Superoperator ===
In using the SIC-POVM elements, an interesting superoperator can be constructed, the likes of which map $\mathcal{L}(\mathcal{H}) \rightarrow \mathcal{L}(\mathcal{H})$. This operator is most useful in considering the relation of SIC-POVMs with spherical t-designs. Consider the map

$$\begin{align} \mathcal{G}: \mathcal{L}(\mathcal{H}) &\rightarrow  \mathcal{L}(\mathcal{H})\\
A &\mapsto      \displaystyle \sum_\alpha |\psi_\alpha \rangle \langle \psi_\alpha | A |\psi_\alpha \rangle \langle \psi_\alpha | \end{align}$$

This operator acts on a SIC-POVM element in a way very similar to identity, in that

$$\begin{align} \mathcal{G}(\Pi_\beta) &= \displaystyle \sum_\alpha \Pi_\alpha \left| \langle \psi_\alpha | \psi_\beta \rangle \right|^2 \\
&= \displaystyle \Pi_\beta + \frac{1}{d+1} \sum_{\alpha \neq \beta} \Pi_\alpha \\
&= \displaystyle \frac{d}{d+1} \Pi_\beta + \frac{1}{d+1} \Pi_\beta + \frac{1}{d+1} \sum_{\alpha \neq \beta} \Pi_\alpha \\
&= \displaystyle \frac{d}{d+1} \Pi_\beta + \frac{d}{d+1}\sum_\alpha \frac{1}{d}\Pi_\alpha \\
&= \displaystyle \frac{d}{d+1} \left( \Pi_\beta + I \right)
\end{align}$$

But since elements of a SIC-POVM can completely and uniquely determine any quantum state, this linear operator can be applied to the decomposition of any state, resulting in the ability to write the following:

$G = \frac{d}{d+1} \left( \mathcal{I} + I \right)$ where $I(A) = A \text{ and } \mathcal{I}(A) = \mathrm{Tr}(A)I$

From here, the left inverse can be calculated to be $G^{-1} = \frac1d \left[ \left(d+1\right)I - \mathcal{I} \right]$, and so with the knowledge that

$$I=G^{-1}G = \frac1d \sum_\alpha \left[ (d+1)\Pi_\alpha \odot \Pi_\alpha - I\odot \Pi_\alpha \right]$$,

an expression for a state $\rho$ can be created in terms of a quasi-probability distribution, as follows:

$$\begin{align} \rho = I | \rho ) &= \displaystyle \sum_\alpha \left[ (d+1)\Pi_\alpha - I \right] \frac{ (\Pi_\alpha|\rho)}{d} \\
&= \displaystyle \sum_\alpha \left[ (d+1)\Pi_\alpha - I \right] \frac{ \mathrm{Tr}(\Pi_\alpha\rho)}{d} \\
&= \displaystyle \sum_\alpha p_\alpha \left[ (d+1)\Pi_\alpha - I \right] \quad \text{ where } p_\alpha = \mathrm{Tr}(\Pi_\alpha\rho)/d\\
&= \displaystyle -I + (d+1) \sum_\alpha p_\alpha |\psi_\alpha \rangle \langle \psi_\alpha | \\
&= \displaystyle \sum_\alpha \left[ (d+1)p_\alpha - \frac1d \right]  |\psi_\alpha \rangle \langle \psi_\alpha |
\end{align}$$

where $| \rho )$ is the Dirac notation for the density operator viewed in the Hilbert space $\mathcal{L} (\mathcal{H})$. This shows that the appropriate quasi-probability distribution (termed as such because it may yield negative results) representation of the state $\rho$ is given by

$$(d+1)p_\alpha - \frac1d$$

== Finding SIC sets ==
=== Simplest example ===
For $d=2$ the equations that define the SIC-POVM can be solved by hand, yielding the vectors

$$\begin{align}
|\psi_1\rangle &= |0\rangle \\
|\psi_2\rangle &= \frac1{\sqrt3}|0\rangle + \sqrt{\frac23}|1\rangle \\
|\psi_3\rangle &= \frac1{\sqrt3}|0\rangle + \sqrt{\frac23}e^{i\frac{2\pi}{3}}|1\rangle \\
|\psi_4\rangle &= \frac1{\sqrt3}|0\rangle + \sqrt{\frac23}e^{i\frac{4\pi}{3}}|1\rangle,
\end{align}$$

which form the vertices of a regular tetrahedron in the Bloch sphere. The projectors that define the SIC-POVM are given by $\Pi_i = |\psi_i\rangle\langle\psi_i|$, and the elements of the SIC-POVM are thus $F_i=\Pi_i/2=|\psi_i\rangle\!\langle\psi_i|/2$.

For higher dimensions this is not feasible, necessitating the use of a more sophisticated approach.

=== Group covariance ===
==== General group covariance ====
A SIC-POVM $P$ is said to be group covariant if there exists a group $G$ with a $d^2$-dimensional unitary representation such that

- $\forall |\psi\rangle\langle \psi | \in P, \quad \forall U_g \in G,\quad U_g|\psi\rangle \in P$
- $\forall |\psi\rangle\langle \psi |, |\phi \rangle\langle \phi | \in P, \quad \exists U_g \in G, \quad U_g |\phi \rangle = | \psi \rangle$

The search for SIC-POVMs can be greatly simplified by exploiting the property of group covariance. Indeed, the problem is reduced to finding a normalized fiducial vector $| \phi \rangle$ such that

$$| \langle \phi | U_g | \phi \rangle |^2 =  \frac{1}{d+1} \ \forall g \neq id$$.

The SIC-POVM is then the set generated by the group action of $U_g$ on $|\phi \rangle$.

==== The case of Z_{d} × Z_{d} ====
So far, most SIC-POVM's have been found by considering group covariance under $\mathbb{Z}_d \times \mathbb{Z}_d$. To construct the unitary representation, we map $\mathbb{Z}_d \times \mathbb{Z}_d$ to $U(d)$, the group of unitary operators on d-dimensions. Several operators must first be introduced. Let $|e_j \rangle$ be a basis for $\mathcal{H}$, then the phase operator is

$T|e_j \rangle = \omega^j |e_j \rangle$ where $\omega = e^{\frac{2\pi i}{d}}$ is a root of unity

and the shift operator as

$$S|e_j \rangle = |e_{j+1 \pmod{d}} \rangle$$

Combining these two operators yields the unitary Weyl operator $W(p,q) = S^p T^q$, which generates the Heisenberg-Weyl group.

It can be checked that the mapping $(p,q) \in \mathbb{Z}_d \times \mathbb{Z}_d \rightarrow W(p,q)$ is a projective unitary representation. It also satisfies all of the properties for group covariance, and is useful for numerical calculation of SIC sets.

=== Zauner's conjecture ===
Given some of the useful properties of SIC-POVMs, it would be useful if it were positively known whether such sets could be constructed in a Hilbert space of arbitrary dimension. Originally proposed in the dissertation of Zauner, a conjecture about the existence of a fiducial vector for arbitrary dimensions was hypothesized.

More specifically,

For every dimension $d\geq 2$ there exists a SIC-POVM whose elements are the orbit of a positive rank-one operator $E_0$ under the Weyl–Heisenberg group $H_d$. What is more, $E_0$ commutes with an element T of the Jacobi group $J_d=H_d \rtimes SL(2,\mathbb{Z}_d)$. The action of T on $H_d$ modulo the center has order three.

Utilizing the notion of group covariance on $\mathbb{Z}_d \times \mathbb{Z}_d$, this can be restated as

For any dimension $d \in \mathbb{N}$, let $\left\{ k \right\}_{k=0}^{d-1}$ be an orthonormal basis for $\mathbb{C}^d$, and define

$$\displaystyle \omega = e^{\frac{2\pi i}{d}}, \quad \quad D_{j,k} = \omega^{\frac{jk}{2}} \sum_{m=0}^{d-1}\omega^{jm} | k+m\pmod{d} \rangle \langle m |$$

Then $\exists |\phi \rangle \in \mathbb{C}^d$ such that the set $\left\{ D_{j,k} |\phi \rangle \right\}_{j,k=1}^d$ is a SIC-POVM.

=== Progress on Zauner's conjecture ===
Zauner's conjecture on the existence of SIC-POVMs for arbitrary dimensions has been a long-standing open question.

Exact expressions for SIC sets have been found for Hilbert spaces of all dimensions from $d=2$ through $d = 53$ inclusive, and in some higher dimensions as large as $d = 5779$, for 115 values of $d$ in all. (Note: Details of these exact solutions can be found in the literature.) Furthermore, using the Heisenberg group covariance on $\mathbb{Z}_d\times \mathbb{Z}_d$, numerical solutions have been found for all integers up through $d=193$, and in some larger dimensions up to $d = 2208$. (Note: Like the exact solutions, the numerical solutions have been presented over the years in a series of publications by different authors.)

There exists a construction that has been conjectured to work for all prime dimensions of the form $n^2+3$ for integer $n$.

In 2025, Appleby, Flammia and Kopp gave a construction of SICs that was conjectured to work for all dimensions. This relied on a number theoretic conjecture that was claimed to be settled by Radchenko and Wheeler in 2026.

== Relation to spherical t-designs ==
A spherical t-design is a set of vectors $S=\left\{ | \phi_k \rangle : |\phi_k \rangle \in \mathbb{S}^d \right\}$ on the d-dimensional generalized hypersphere, such that the average value of any $t^{th}$-order polynomial $f_t(\psi)$ over $S$ is equal to the average of $f_t(\psi)$ over all normalized vectors $| \psi \rangle$. Defining $\mathcal{H}_t = \displaystyle \bigotimes_{i=1}^t \mathcal{H}$ as the t-fold tensor product of the Hilbert spaces, and

$$S_t = \displaystyle \sum_{k=1}^n | \Phi_k^t \rangle \langle \Phi_k^t | , \quad |\Phi_k^t\rangle = |\phi_k\rangle^{\otimes t}$$

as the t-fold tensor product frame operator, it can be shown that a set of normalized vectors $\left\{ | \phi_k \rangle \in \mathbb{S}^d \right\}_{k=1}^n$ with $n \geq {t+d-1 \choose d-1}$ forms a spherical t-design if and only if

$$\displaystyle \mathrm{Tr}\left[ S_t^2 \right] = \sum_{j,k} \left| \langle \phi_j | \phi_k \rangle \right|^{2t} = \frac{n^2 t! (d-1)!}{(t+d-1)!}$$

It then immediately follows that every SIC-POVM is a 2-design, since $d^2 \geq {d+2-1 \choose d-1} = \frac{d(d+1)}{2}$ and

$$\mathrm{Tr}(S^2_2) =  \displaystyle \sum_{j,k} |\langle \phi_j |\phi_k \rangle |^4 = \frac{2d^3}{d+1}$$

which is precisely the necessary value that satisfies the above theorem.

== Relation to mutually unbiased bases ==
In a d-dimensional Hilbert space, two distinct bases $\left\{|\psi_i\rangle \right\}, \left\{ |\phi_j \rangle \right\}$ are said to be mutually unbiased if

$$\displaystyle |\langle \psi_i | \phi_j \rangle|^2 = \frac{1}{d}, \quad \forall i,j$$

This seems similar in nature to the symmetric property of SIC-POVMs. Wootters points out that a complete set of $d+1$ unbiased bases yields a geometric structure known as a finite projective plane, while a SIC-POVM (in any dimension that is a prime power) yields a finite affine plane, a type of structure whose definition is identical to that of a finite projective plane with the roles of points and lines exchanged. In this sense, the problems of SIC-POVMs and of mutually unbiased bases are dual to one another.

In dimension $d = 3$, the analogy can be taken further: a complete set of mutually unbiased bases can be directly constructed from a SIC-POVM. The 9 vectors of the SIC-POVM, together with the 12 vectors of the mutually unbiased bases, form a set that can be used in a Kochen–Specker proof. However, in 6-dimensional Hilbert space, a SIC-POVM is known, but no complete set of mutually unbiased bases has yet been discovered, and it is widely believed that no such set exists.

== See also ==
- Measurement in quantum mechanics
- Mutually unbiased bases
- POVM
- QBism
