= QBism =

Interpretation of quantum mechanics

Each point in the Bloch ball is a possible quantum state for a qubit. In QBism, all quantum states are representations of personal probabilities.

In physics and the philosophy of physics, QBism (pronounced "cubism") is an interpretation of quantum mechanics that takes an agent's actions and experiences as the central concerns of the theory. It is the most prominent and extreme form of quantum Bayesianism, a collection of related approaches that all involve interpreting quantum probabilities as Bayesian in some manner. QBism deals with common questions in the interpretation of quantum theory about the nature of wavefunction superposition, quantum measurement, and entanglement. According to QBism, many, but not all, aspects of the quantum formalism are subjective in nature. For example, in this interpretation, a quantum state is not an element of reality—instead, it represents the degrees of belief an agent has about the possible outcomes of measurements. For this reason, some philosophers of science have deemed QBism a form of anti-realism. The originators of the interpretation disagree with this characterization, proposing instead that the theory more properly aligns with a kind of realism they call "participatory realism", wherein reality consists of more than can be captured by any putative third-person account of it.

This interpretation is distinguished by its use of a subjective Bayesian account of probabilities to understand the quantum mechanical Born rule as a normative addition to good decision-making. Rooted in the prior work of Carlton Caves, Christopher Fuchs, and Rüdiger Schack during the early 2000s, QBism itself is primarily associated with Fuchs and Schack and has more recently been adopted by David Mermin. QBism draws from the fields of quantum information and Bayesian probability and aims to eliminate the interpretational conundrums that have beset quantum theory. The QBist interpretation is historically derivative of the views of the various physicists that are often grouped together as "the" Copenhagen interpretation, but is itself distinct from them.

In addition to presenting an interpretation of the existing mathematical structure of quantum theory, some QBists have advocated a research program of reconstructing quantum theory from basic physical principles whose QBist character is manifest. The ultimate goal of this research is to identify what aspects of the ontology of the physical world make quantum theory a good tool for agents to use. However, the QBist interpretation itself, as described in § Core positions, does not depend on any particular reconstruction.

== History and development ==
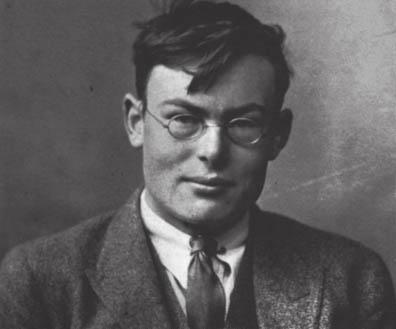
British philosopher, mathematician, and economist Frank Ramsey, whose interpretation of probability theory inspired quantum Bayesianism.

E. T. Jaynes, a promoter of the use of Bayesian probability in statistical physics, once suggested that quantum theory is "[a] peculiar mixture describing in part realities of Nature, in part incomplete human information about Nature—all scrambled up by Heisenberg and Bohr into an omelette that nobody has seen how to unscramble". This point of view inspired the development of quantum Bayesianism. Jaynes pointed out that a mixed quantum state can be written in multiple different ways as a statistical mixture of pure states. (This is part of what would later be known as the Schrödinger–HJW theorem.) So, if pure states are supposed to represent objective uncertainty while the weights in the mixture are subjective probabilities representing an observer's uncertainty as to which pure state is truly present, then the subjective and objective have become completely intermingled: many distinct combinations of subjective and objective entities yield exactly the same physical predictions.

A 2002 paper by Carlton Caves, Christopher A. Fuchs and Ruediger Schack proposed interpreting quantum probability as a form of Bayesian probability. However, all three authors grew dissatisfied with that paper, and ultimately diverged in their views on how to resolve the problems; Fuchs and Schack developed their position into QBism.

Christopher Fuchs introduced the term "QBism" and outlined the interpretation in more or less its present form in 2010, carrying further and demanding consistency of ideas broached earlier, notably in publications from 2002. Several subsequent works have expanded and elaborated upon these foundations, notably a Reviews of Modern Physics article by Fuchs and Schack; an American Journal of Physics article by Fuchs, Mermin, and Schack; and Enrico Fermi Summer School lecture notes by Fuchs and Stacey.

Fuchs chose to call the interpretation "QBism", pronounced "cubism", preserving the Bayesian spirit via the CamelCase in the first two letters, but distancing it from Bayesianism more broadly. As this neologism is a homophone of Cubism the art movement, it has motivated conceptual comparisons between the two, and media coverage of QBism has been illustrated with art by Picasso and Gris.

== Background ==
There are many interpretations of probability theory. Broadly speaking, these interpretations fall into one of three categories: those which assert that a probability is an objective property of reality (the propensity school), those who assert that probability is an objective property of the measuring process (frequentists), and those which assert that a probability is a cognitive construct which an agent may use to quantify their ignorance or degree of belief in a proposition (Bayesians). QBism begins by asserting that all probabilities, even those appearing in quantum theory, are most properly viewed as members of the latter category. Specifically, QBism adopts a personalist Bayesian interpretation along the lines of Italian mathematician Bruno de Finetti and English philosopher Frank Ramsey.

According to QBists, the advantages of adopting this view of probability are twofold. First, for QBists the role of quantum states, such as the wavefunctions of particles, is to efficiently encode probabilities; so quantum states are ultimately degrees of belief themselves. (If one considers any single measurement that is a minimal, informationally complete positive operator-valued measure (POVM), this is especially clear: A quantum state is mathematically equivalent to a single probability distribution, the distribution over the possible outcomes of that measurement.) Regarding quantum states as degrees of belief implies that the event of a quantum state changing when a measurement occurs—the "collapse of the wave function"—is simply the agent updating her beliefs in response to a new experience. Second, it suggests that quantum mechanics can be thought of as a local theory, because the Einstein–Podolsky–Rosen (EPR) criterion of reality can be rejected. The EPR criterion states: "If, without in any way disturbing a system, we can predict with certainty (i.e., with probability equal to unity) the value of a physical quantity, then there exists an element of reality corresponding to that quantity." Arguments that quantum mechanics should be considered a nonlocal theory depend upon this principle, but to a QBist, it is invalid, because a personalist Bayesian considers all probabilities, even those equal to unity, to be degrees of belief. Therefore, while many interpretations of quantum theory conclude that quantum mechanics is a nonlocal theory, QBists do not.

== Core positions ==
According to QBism, quantum theory is a tool which an agent may use to help manage their expectations, more like probability theory than a conventional physical theory. Quantum theory, QBism claims, is fundamentally a guide for decision making which has been shaped by some aspects of physical reality. Chief among the tenets of QBism are the following:

1. All probabilities, including those equal to zero or one, are valuations that an agent ascribes to their degrees of belief in possible outcomes. As they define and update probabilities, quantum states (density operators), channels (completely positive trace-preserving maps), and measurements (positive operator-valued measures) are also the personal judgements of an agent.
2. The Born rule is normative, not descriptive. It is a relation to which an agent should strive to adhere in their probability and quantum-state assignments.
3. Quantum measurement outcomes are personal experiences for the agent gambling on them. Different agents may confer and agree upon the consequences of a measurement, but the outcome is the experience each of them individually has.
4. A measurement apparatus is conceptually an extension of the agent. It should be considered analogous to a sense organ or prosthetic limb—simultaneously a tool and a part of the individual.

== Reception and criticism ==
Jean Metzinger, 1912, Danseuse au café. One advocate of QBism, physicist David Mermin, describes his rationale for choosing that term over the older and more general "quantum Bayesianism": "I prefer [the] term 'QBist' because [this] view of quantum mechanics differs from others as radically as cubism differs from renaissance painting ..."

Reactions to the QBist interpretation have ranged from enthusiastic to strongly negative. On the supportive side, Theodor Hänsch has characterized QBism as sharpening older Copenhagen-type views and making them more consistent. Some who have criticized QBism claim that it fails to meet the goal of resolving paradoxes in quantum theory. Bacciagaluppi argues that QBism's treatment of measurement outcomes does not ultimately resolve the issue of nonlocality, and Jaeger finds QBism's supposition that the interpretation of probability is key for the resolution to be unnatural and unconvincing. Norsen has accused QBism of solipsism, and Wallace identifies QBism as an instance of instrumentalism; QBists have argued insistently that these characterizations are misunderstandings, and that QBism is neither solipsist nor instrumentalist. A critical article by Nauenberg in the American Journal of Physics prompted a reply by Fuchs, Mermin, and Schack.

Some assert that there may be inconsistencies; for example, Stairs argues that when a probability assignment equals one, it cannot be a degree of belief as QBists say. Further, while also raising concerns about the treatment of probability-one assignments, Timpson suggests that quantum-Bayesian approaches may result in a reduction of explanatory power as compared to other interpretations. Fuchs and Schack replied to these concerns in a later article. Mermin advocated QBism in a 2012 Physics Today article, which prompted considerable discussion. Several further critiques of QBism which arose in response to Mermin's article, and Mermin's replies to these comments, may be found in the Physics Today readers' forum. Section 2 of the Stanford Encyclopedia of Philosophy entry on QBism also contains a summary of objections to the interpretation, and some replies. Ballentine argues that "the initial assumption of QBism is not valid" because the inferential probability of Bayesian theory used by QBism is not applicable to quantum mechanics. Others are opposed to QBism on more general philosophical grounds; for example, Mohrhoff criticizes QBism from the standpoint of Kantian philosophy.

Certain authors find QBism internally self-consistent, but do not subscribe to the interpretation. For example, Marchildon finds QBism well-defined in a way that, to him, many-worlds interpretations are not, but he ultimately prefers a Bohmian interpretation. Similarly, Schlosshauer and Claringbold state that QBism is a consistent interpretation of quantum mechanics, but do not offer a verdict on whether it should be preferred. In addition, some agree with most, but perhaps not all, of the core tenets of QBism; Barnum's position, as well as Appleby's, are examples.

Popularized or semi-popularized media coverage of QBism has appeared in New Scientist, Scientific American, Nature, Science News, the FQXi Community, the Frankfurter Allgemeine Zeitung, Quanta Magazine, Aeon, Discover, Nautilus Quarterly, and Big Think. In 2018, two popular-science books about the interpretation of quantum mechanics, Ball's Beyond Weird and Ananthaswamy's Through Two Doors at Once, devoted sections to QBism. Furthermore, Harvard University Press published von Baeyer's popularized treatment of the subject, QBism: The Future of Quantum Physics, in 2016.

The philosophy literature has also discussed QBism from the viewpoints of structural realism and of phenomenology.

== Relation to other interpretations ==
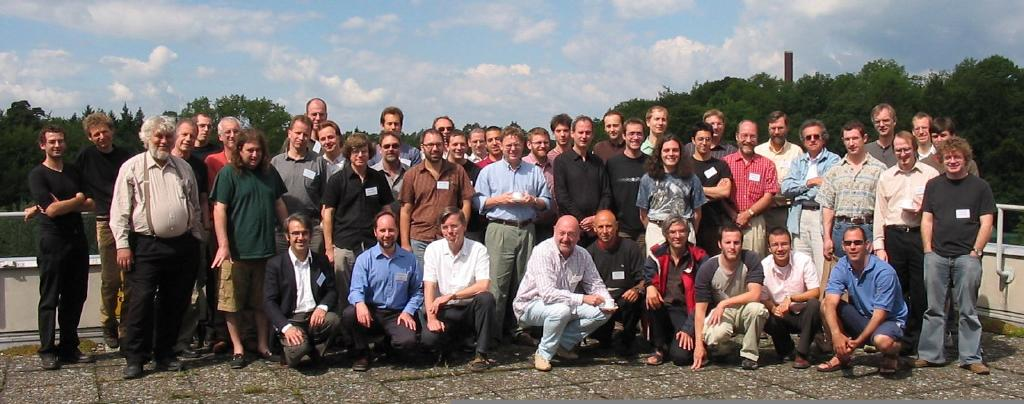
Group photo from the 2005 University of Konstanz conference Being Bayesian in a Quantum World.

=== Copenhagen interpretations ===
The views of many physicists (Bohr, Heisenberg, Rosenfeld, von Weizsäcker, Peres, etc.) are often grouped together as the "Copenhagen interpretation" of quantum mechanics. Several authors have deprecated this terminology, claiming that it is historically misleading and obscures differences between physicists that are as important as their similarities. QBism shares many characteristics in common with the ideas often labeled as "the Copenhagen interpretation", but the differences are important; to conflate them or to regard QBism as a minor modification of the points of view of Bohr or Heisenberg, for instance, would be a substantial misrepresentation.

QBism takes probabilities to be personal judgments of the individual agent who is using quantum mechanics. This contrasts with older Copenhagen-type views, which hold that probabilities are given by quantum states that are in turn fixed by objective facts about preparation procedures. QBism considers a measurement to be any action that an agent takes to elicit a response from the world and the outcome of that measurement to be the experience the world's response induces back on that agent. As a consequence, communication between agents is the only means by which different agents can attempt to compare their internal experiences. Most variants of the Copenhagen interpretation, however, hold that the outcomes of experiments are agent-independent pieces of reality for anyone to access. QBism claims that these points on which it differs from previous Copenhagen-type interpretations resolve the obscurities that many critics have found in the latter, by changing the role that quantum theory plays (even though QBism does not yet provide a specific underlying ontology). Specifically, QBism posits that quantum theory is a normative tool which an agent may use to better navigate reality, rather than a set of mechanics governing it.

=== Other epistemic interpretations ===
Approaches to quantum theory, like QBism, which treat quantum states as expressions of information, knowledge, belief, or expectation are called "epistemic" interpretations. These approaches differ from each other in what they consider quantum states to be information or expectations "about", as well as in the technical features of the mathematics they employ. Furthermore, not all authors who advocate views of this type propose an answer to the question of what the information represented in quantum states concerns. In the words of the paper that introduced the Spekkens Toy Model:

if a quantum state is a state of knowledge, and it is not knowledge of local and noncontextual hidden variables, then what is it knowledge about? We do not at present have a good answer to this question. We shall therefore remain completely agnostic about the nature of the reality to which the knowledge represented by quantum states pertains. This is not to say that the question is not important. Rather, we see the epistemic approach as an unfinished project, and this question as the central obstacle to its completion. Nonetheless, we argue that even in the absence of an answer to this question, a case can be made for the epistemic view. The key is that one can hope to identify phenomena that are characteristic of states of incomplete knowledge regardless of what this knowledge is about.

Leifer and Spekkens propose a way of treating quantum probabilities as Bayesian probabilities, thereby considering quantum states as epistemic, which they state is "closely aligned in its philosophical starting point" with QBism. However, they remain deliberately agnostic about what physical properties or entities quantum states are information (or beliefs) about, as opposed to QBism, which offers an answer to that question. Another approach, advocated by Bub and Pitowsky, argues that quantum states are information about propositions within event spaces that form non-Boolean lattices. On occasion, the proposals of Bub and Pitowsky are also called "quantum Bayesianism".

Zeilinger and Brukner have also proposed an interpretation of quantum mechanics in which "information" is a fundamental concept, and in which quantum states are epistemic quantities. Unlike QBism, the Brukner–Zeilinger interpretation treats some probabilities as objectively fixed. In the Brukner–Zeilinger interpretation, a quantum state represents the information that a hypothetical observer in possession of all possible data would have. Put another way, a quantum state belongs in their interpretation to an optimally informed agent, whereas in QBism, any agent can formulate a state to encode her own expectations. Despite this difference, in Cabello's classification, the proposals of Zeilinger and Brukner are also designated as "participatory realism", as QBism and the Copenhagen-type interpretations are.

Bayesian, or epistemic, interpretations of quantum probabilities were proposed in the early 1990s by Baez and Youssef.

=== Von Neumann's views ===
R. F. Streater argued that "[t]he first quantum Bayesian was von Neumann", basing that claim on von Neumann's textbook The Mathematical Foundations of Quantum Mechanics. Blake Stacey disagrees, arguing that the views expressed in that book on the nature of quantum states and the interpretation of probability are not compatible with QBism, or indeed, with any position that might be called quantum Bayesianism.

=== Relational quantum mechanics ===
Comparisons have also been made between QBism and the relational quantum mechanics (RQM) espoused by Carlo Rovelli and others. In both QBism and RQM, quantum states are not intrinsic properties of physical systems. Both QBism and RQM deny the existence of an absolute, universal wavefunction. Furthermore, both QBism and RQM insist that quantum mechanics is a fundamentally local theory. In addition, Rovelli, like several QBist authors, advocates reconstructing quantum theory from physical principles in order to bring clarity to the subject of quantum foundations. (The QBist approaches to doing so are different from Rovelli's, and are described below.) One important distinction between the two interpretations is their philosophy of probability: RQM does not adopt the Ramsey–de Finetti school of personalist Bayesianism. Moreover, RQM does not insist that a measurement outcome is necessarily an agent's experience.

=== Other uses of Bayesian probability in quantum physics ===
QBism should be distinguished from other applications of Bayesian inference in quantum physics, and from quantum analogues of Bayesian inference. For example, some in the field of computer science have introduced a kind of quantum Bayesian network, which they argue could have applications in "medical diagnosis, monitoring of processes, and genetics". Bayesian inference has also been applied in quantum theory for updating probability densities over quantum states, and MaxEnt methods have been used in similar ways. Bayesian methods for quantum state and process tomography are an active area of research.

== Technical developments and reconstructing quantum theory ==
Conceptual concerns about the interpretation of quantum mechanics and the meaning of probability have motivated technical work. A quantum version of the de Finetti theorem, introduced by Caves, Fuchs, and Schack (independently reproving a result found using different means by Størmer) to provide a Bayesian understanding of the idea of an "unknown quantum state", has found application elsewhere, in topics like quantum key distribution and entanglement detection.

Adherents of several interpretations of quantum mechanics, QBism included, have been motivated to reconstruct quantum theory. The goal of these research efforts has been to identify a new set of axioms or postulates from which the mathematical structure of quantum theory can be derived, in the hope that with such a reformulation, the features of nature which made quantum theory the way it is might be more easily identified. Although the core tenets of QBism do not demand such a reconstruction, some QBists—Fuchs, in particular—have argued that the task should be pursued.

One topic prominent in the reconstruction effort is the set of mathematical structures known as symmetric, informationally-complete, positive operator-valued measures (SIC-POVMs). QBist foundational research stimulated interest in these structures, which now have applications in quantum theory outside of foundational studies and in pure mathematics.

The most extensively explored QBist reformulation of quantum theory involves the use of SIC-POVMs to rewrite quantum states (either pure or mixed) as a set of probabilities defined over the outcomes of a "Bureau of Standards" measurement. That is, if one expresses a density matrix as a probability distribution over the outcomes of a SIC-POVM experiment, one can reproduce all the statistical predictions implied by the density matrix from the SIC-POVM probabilities instead. The Born rule then takes the role of relating one valid probability distribution to another, rather than of deriving probabilities from something apparently more fundamental. Fuchs, Schack, and others have taken to calling this restatement of the Born rule the urgleichung, from the German for "primal equation" (see Ur- prefix), because of the central role it plays in their reconstruction of quantum theory.

The following discussion presumes some familiarity with the mathematics of quantum information theory, and in particular, the modeling of measurement procedures by POVMs. Consider a quantum system to which is associated a $d$-dimensional Hilbert space. If a set of $d^2$ rank-1 projectors $\hat{\Pi}_i$ satisfying
$$\operatorname{tr}\hat{\Pi}_i\hat{\Pi}_j=\frac{d\delta_{ij}+1}{d+1}$$
exists, then one may form a SIC-POVM $\hat{H}_i=\frac{1}{d}\hat{\Pi}_i$. An arbitrary quantum state $\hat{\rho}$ may be written as a linear combination of the SIC projectors
$$\hat{\rho}=\sum_{i=1}^{d^2} \left[(d+1)P(H_i)-\frac 1 d \right] \hat{\Pi}_i,$$
where $P(H_i)=\operatorname{tr}\hat{\rho} \hat{H}_i$ is the Born rule probability for obtaining SIC measurement outcome $H_i$ implied by the state assignment $\hat{\rho}$. We follow the convention that operators have hats while experiences (that is, measurement outcomes) do not. Now consider an arbitrary quantum measurement, denoted by the POVM $\{\hat{D}_j\}$. The urgleichung is the expression obtained from forming the Born rule probabilities, $Q(D_j)=\operatorname{tr}\hat{\rho} \hat{D}_j$, for the outcomes of this quantum measurement,
$$Q(D_j)=\sum_{i=1}^{d^2}\left[(d+1)P(H_i)-\frac{1}{d}\right]P(D_j\mid H_i),$$
where $P(D_j\mid H_i)\equiv\operatorname{tr}\hat{\Pi}_i\hat{D}_j$ is the Born rule probability for obtaining outcome $D_j$ implied by the state assignment $\hat{\Pi}_i$. The $P(D_j\mid H_i)$ term may be understood to be a conditional probability in a cascaded measurement scenario: Imagine that an agent plans to perform two measurements, first a SIC measurement and then the $\{D_j\}$ measurement. After obtaining an outcome from the SIC measurement, the agent will update her state assignment to a new quantum state $\hat{\rho}'$ before performing the second measurement. If she uses the Lüders rule for state update and obtains outcome $H_i$ from the SIC measurement, then $\hat{\rho}'=\hat{\Pi}_i$. Thus the probability for obtaining outcome $D_j$ for the second measurement conditioned on obtaining outcome $H_i$ for the SIC measurement is $P(D_j\mid H_i)$.

Note that the urgleichung is structurally very similar to the law of total probability, which is the expression
$$P(D_j)=\sum_{i=1}^{d^2}P(H_i)P(D_j\mid H_i).$$
They functionally differ only by a dimension-dependent affine transformation of the SIC probability vector. As QBism says that quantum theory is an empirically-motivated normative addition to probability theory, Fuchs and others find the appearance of a structure in quantum theory analogous to one in probability theory to be an indication that a reformulation featuring the urgleichung prominently may help to reveal the properties of nature which made quantum theory so successful.

The urgleichung does not replace the law of total probability. Rather, the urgleichung and the law of total probability apply in different scenarios because $P(D_j)$ and $Q(D_j)$ refer to different situations. $P(D_j)$ is the probability that an agent assigns for obtaining outcome $D_j$ on her second of two planned measurements, that is, for obtaining outcome $D_j$ after first making the SIC measurement and obtaining one of the $H_i$ outcomes. $Q(D_j)$, on the other hand, is the probability an agent assigns for obtaining outcome $D_j$ when she does not plan to first make the SIC measurement. The law of total probability is a consequence of coherence within the operational context of performing the two measurements as described. The urgleichung, in contrast, is a relation between different contexts which finds its justification in the predictive success of quantum physics.

The SIC representation of quantum states also provides a reformulation of quantum dynamics. Consider a quantum state $\hat{\rho}$ with SIC representation $P(H_i)$. The time evolution of this state is found by applying a unitary operator $\hat{U}$ to form the new state $\hat{U}\hat{\rho}\hat{U}^\dagger$, which has the SIC representation

$$P_t(H_i)=\operatorname{tr}\left[(\hat{U}\hat{\rho}\hat{U}^\dagger) \hat{H}_i\right]=\operatorname{tr}\left[\hat{\rho}(\hat{U}^\dagger \hat{H}_i \hat{U}) \right].$$

The second equality is written in the Heisenberg picture of quantum dynamics, with respect to which the time evolution of a quantum system is captured by the probabilities associated with a rotated SIC measurement $\{D_j\}=\{\hat{U}^\dagger \hat{H}_j\hat{U}\}$ of the original quantum state $\hat{\rho}$. Then the Schrödinger equation is completely captured in the urgleichung for this measurement:
$$P_t(H_j)=\sum_{i=1}^{d^2}\left[(d+1)P(H_i)-\frac 1 d \right]P(D_j\mid H_i).$$
In these terms, the Schrödinger equation is an instance of the Born rule applied to the passing of time; an agent uses it to relate how she will gamble on informationally complete measurements potentially performed at different times.

Those QBists who find this approach promising are pursuing a complete reconstruction of quantum theory featuring the urgleichung as the key postulate. (The urgleichung has also been discussed in the context of category theory.) Comparisons between this approach and others not associated with QBism (or indeed with any particular interpretation) can be found in a book chapter by Fuchs and Stacey and an article by Appleby et al. As of 2017, alternative QBist reconstruction efforts are in the beginning stages.

== See also ==
- Bayes factor
- Bayesian inference
- Credible intervals
- Degree of belief
- Doxastic logic
- Philosophy of science
- Quantum logic
- Quantum probability
- Statistical inference
