= Como Conference =

1927 physics conference in Como, Italy

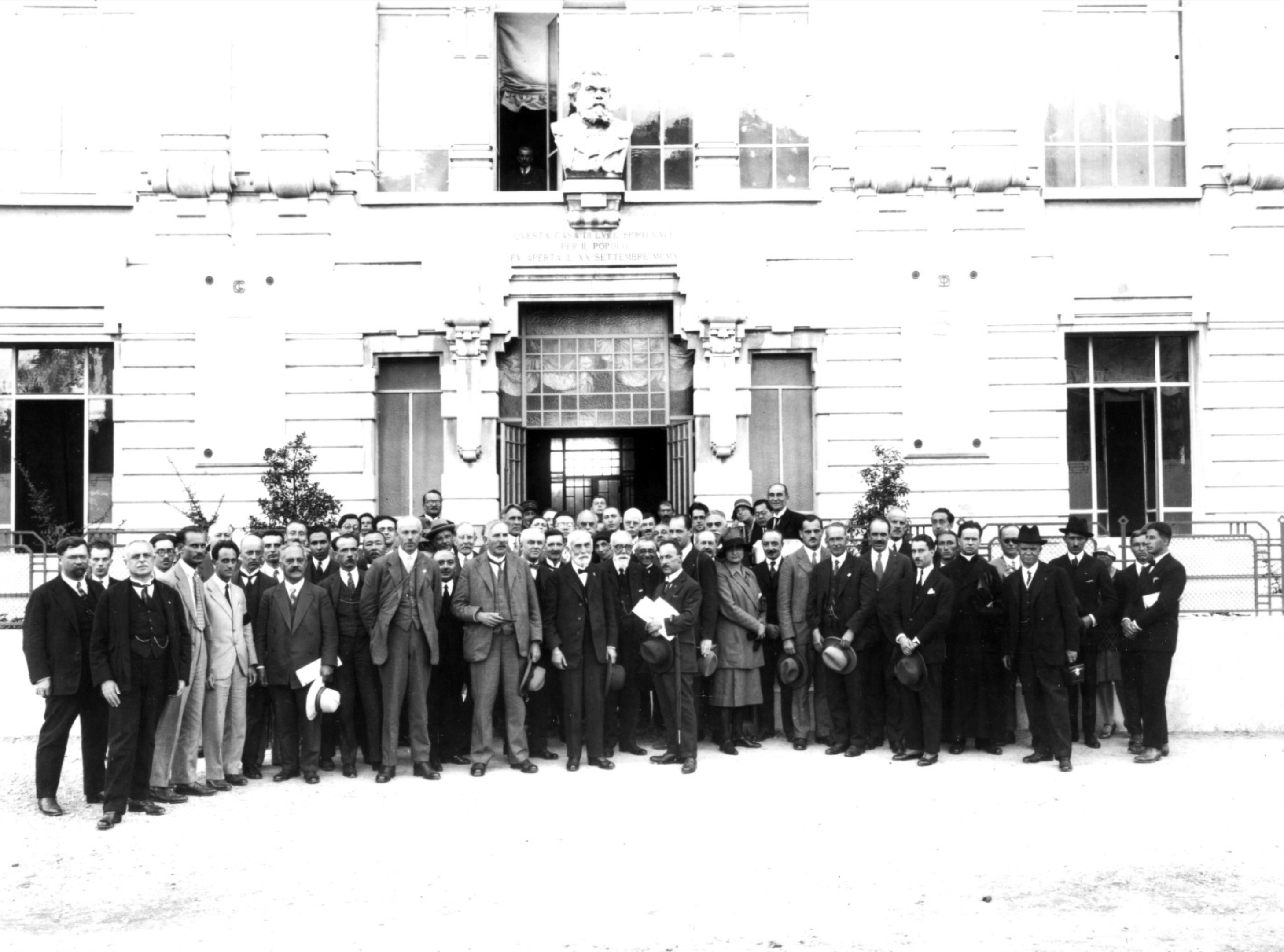
Picture at the conference venue.

The International Congress of Physicists (Italian: Congresso internazionale dei fisici), better known as the Como Conference or the Volta Conference, was an international academic conference held from 11 to 27 September 1927, near Lake Como, Italy as part of a series of celebrations of the hundredth anniversary of the death of Alessandro Volta. This conference inspired the Volta Congresses held in Rome and organized since 1931.

It concerned the topic of Volta's work and quantum mechanics. It gathered 61 physicists and mathematicians from all over the world. During the conference, Niels Bohr first introduced the principle of complementarity. The first quantum theory of metals was also discussed through the works of Arnold Sommerfeld and Enrico Fermi.

== Organization ==
The conference was part of the Volta centennial anniversary celebrations (Italian: Celebrazioni voltiane) ordered by the government of Benito Mussolini.

The physics conference was organized by the Italian Physical Society. The program was organized by Quirino Majorana, president of the society. He was joined by Hendrik Lorentz, Aimé Cotton, Robert Andrews Millikan, Max von Laue and Giancarlo Vallauri as vicepresidents of the congress.

The first four days were dedicated to works related to Volta, and the rest of the time was reserved for the topic of matter and radiation. The venue was the Carducci Institute at Como. Due to the presence of Guglielmo Marconi, many of the discussions were broadcast via radio.

During the conference, Mussolini hosted a reception with the participants in Rome, in his residence at Villa Torlonia.

== Topics ==
=== Bohr's complementarity ===
On the 16th September, Niels Bohr presented a seminal lecture titled "The Quantum Postulate and the Recent Development of Atomic Theory" that introduced the principle of complementarity. Bohr argued that phenomena at the quantum level exhibit a dual nature—wave–particle duality—but these aspects are excluded of being observed simultaneously.

Oskar Klein and Bohr's brother Harald, helped him prepare the speech. The idea was motivated by a discussion in February–March with Werner Heisenberg, who had recently introduced the uncertainty principle. For Bohr, these two principles were key for the new quantum mechanics. The complementarity principle became the essence of what would become the Copenhagen interpretation, the standard interpretation of quantum mechanics.

During the discussions, Heisenberg discussed the need to find the boundary between quantum evolution and macroscopic dynamics. This discussion represents the introduction of the hypothesis now known as the Heisenberg cut.

Hendrik Lorentz praised Bohr's clarity of the presentation but regretted that there was not enough time for discussions. The same speech was repeated in October during the 5th Solvay Conference, and became part of the Bohr–Einstein debates.

=== Quantum theory of metals ===
During the conference, Arnold Sommerfeld presented the free electron model for metals, which extended the classical Drude model by introducing the recently introduced Fermi statistics and Fermi gas model. These results boosted Enrico Fermi's reputation outside Italy.

=== Electron spin ===
Hendrik Lorentz presented the impossibility of interpreting the electron spin as a classical rotating body. He ruled it out using special relativity. By his calculation, the electron radius would have to be as large at least 10 femtometres to explain its magnetic moment, much larger than expected by experiments. Lorentz wrote about it after being contacted by Paul Ehrenfest, after his assistants George Uhlenbeck and Samuel Goudsmit had postulated the electron spin degree of freedom to explain atomic spectra. This work was Lorentz's last publication.

== Participants ==
The list of physicists that attended included nine of Nobel Prize laureates in Physics, two Nobel Prize laureates in Chemistry, and various founders of quantum mechanics. Physicist Franco Rasetti and others have referred to the list as the Almanach de Gotha of physics. The full list includes:

- Vienna, Austria:
  - Felix Ehrenhaft;
  - Adolf Smekal.
- Toronto, Canada: John Cunningham McLennan.
- Copenhagen, Denmark:
  - Niels Bohr;
  - Werner Heisenberg. (Note: Heisenberg was listed as "Copenhagen, Denmark" even if he was coming from Leipzig.)
- Paris, France:
  - Marcel Brillouin;
  - Maurice de Broglie;
  - Paul Boucherot;
  - Aimé Cotton;
  - Pierre Janet
- Germany
  - Max Born, Göttingen;
  - James Franck, Gottingen;
  - Walther Gerlach, Tübingen;
  - Eduard Grüneisen, Marburg;
  - Max von Laue, Berlin;
  - Friedrich Paschen, Charlottenburg;
  - Wolfgang Pauli, Hamburg;
  - Max Planck, Berlin;
  - Arnold Sommerfeld, Munich;
  - Otto Stern, Hamburg;
  - Karl Willy Wagner, Berlin.
- India:
  - Debendra Mohan Bose, Calcutta;
  - Meghnad Saha, Allahabad.
- Italia:
  - Lavoro Amaduzzi, Parma;
  - Alessandro Amerio, Pavia;
  - Michele Cantone, Naples;
  - Orso Mario Corbino, Rome;
  - Enrico Fermi, Rome;
  - Antonio Garbasso, Florence;
  - Giuseppe Gianfranceschi, Rome;
  - Giovanni Giorgi, Cagliari;
  - Tullio Levi-Civita, Rome;
  - Antonino Lo Surdo, Rome;
  - Quirino Majorana;
  - Guglielmo Marconi, Rome;
  - Michele La Rosa, Palermo;
  - Eligio Perucca, Turin;
  - Carlo Somigliana, Torino;
  - Paolo Straneo, Genoa,
  - Vito Volterra, Rome.
- Netherlands:
  - Hans Kramers, Utrecht;
  - Hendrik Lorentz, Leiden;
  - Pieter Zeeman, Amsterdam.
- Russia:
  - Yakov Frenkel, Leningrad;
  - Petr Lazarev, Moscow.
- Spain:
  - Eduardo Alcobé y Arenas, Barcelona;
  - Blas Cabrera, Madrid.
- Zurich, Switzerland: Peter Debye.
- United Kingdom:
  - Francis William Aston, Cambridge;
  - Lawrence Bragg, Manchester;
  - Arthur Eddington, Cambridge;
  - Owen Richardson, London;
  - Ernest Rutherford, Cambridge.
- United States:
  - Arthur Compton, Chicago;
  - William Duane, Boston;
  - Edwin Hall, Cambridge;
  - Arthur E. Kennelly, Cambridge;
  - Irving Langmuir, New York;
  - Robert Andrews Millikan, Pasadena;
  - Richard C. Tolman, Pasadena;
  - Robert W. Wood, Baltimore.

=== Other invited scientists ===
Albert Einstein did not participate due to his opposition to Mussolini's regime. James Franck wanted also to cancel due to political reasons but he had accepted before knowing that Mussolini would be receiving them. Sommerfeld also expressed reservation in attending, but went to the conference anyway.

In his biography, Emilio Segrè says that he and Franco Rasetti were not invited but entered the lectures anyway. The meetings convinced Segrè to switch careers from engineering to physics.

Some letters suggest that Satyendra Nath Bose might have been invited to the conference, but by error his invitation was sent to Debendra M. Bose. This claim has been contested as S. N. Bose's work was less well known at that time.

== See also ==
- 1900 International Congress of Physics
- Tempio Voltiano
