= Perucca =

Perucca is an Italian surname. Notable people with the surname include:

- Ángel Perucca (1918–1981), Argentine footballer
- Eligio Perucca (1890–1965), Italian physics instructor and researcher
