= Gorga =

Gorga may refer to:

== Places ==
- Gorga, Italy, a municipality in the province of Rome, Lazio, Italy
- Gorga, Spain, a municipality in the province of Alicante, Valencian Community, Spain
- Gorga Cilento or Gorga, a village in the municipality of Stio, province of Salerno, Compania, Italy
- Gorga, Udmurtia or Garga, a hamlet in the Alnashsky District of Udmurtia, Russia

== Other ==
- Gorga (surname)
- Gorga (art) found in the culture of Batak Toba in North Sumatra, Indonesia
- Gorga the Hutt, a character of Star Wars
- The Mighty Gorga, a 1969 American science fiction film
