= Straneo =

Straneo is an Italian surname. Notable people with the surname include:

- Paolo Straneo (1874–1968), Italian mathematical physicist
- Valeria Straneo (born 1976), Italian long-distance runner
- Stefano Ludovico Straneo (1902–1997), Italian entomologist, teacher, academic administrator, and author
