= Carmine Gorga =

Italian political scientist

- Born: December 8, 1935 (age 90); Roccadaspide, Italy

Academic background
- Education: University of Naples
- Influences: J. M. Keynes, Franco Modigliani, Joseph Kaipayil

Academic work
- School or tradition: Aristotelian/Aquinian economics
- Notable ideas: Relationalism

Carmine Gorga (born December 8, 1935) is an Italian political scientist naturalized American working as President of The Somist Institute.

== Life and career ==
Born in Roccadaspide (Salerno), during the great depression in Southern Italy. He was born on December 8, 1935. Came to the United States in 1965. Gorga left Italy to continue his study of The Political Thought of Louis D. Brandeis, the subject of his PhD dissertation at the University of Naples in 1959. This work earned him a Council of Europe Scholarship that led him to the Bologna Center of the Johns Hopkins’ School of Advanced International Studies (SAIS) in 1961 and the following year, thanks to a Fulbright Scholarship, to the Johns Hopkins’ SAIS in Washington, DC, where he received an MA in International Relations. Among other positions, he is currently the president of The Somist Institute. He married Joan R. Mohr in 1969; they have one son, Jonathan. He is a Third Order Carmelite.

=== Education and scholarship ===
Gorga received many scholarships in addition to the Council of Europe Scholarship and scholarship from Johns Hopkins which brought him to America for study. Carmine Gorga earned his Ph.D. in political science at the University of Naples, Italy in 1959 and earned a diploma in International Relations, Bologna Center of the Johns Hopkins University in 1961. He also earned an MA in International Relations from Johns Hopkins' School of Advanced International Studies (SAIS) in Washington, D.C., 1962.

Gorga's scholarly papers and 2002 book, "The Economic Process: An Instantaneous Non-Newtonian Picture," challenged the linear world of economics by introducing concepts of relational analysis and interdisciplinary collaboration which he calls Concordian Economics.

== Books ==
- Gorga, Carmine (2002 and 2010).The economic process: An instantaneous non-Newtonian Picture. Lanham, Md. and Oxford: University Press of America.
- Gorga, Carmine (2008).To My Polis, With Love: May Gloucester Show the World the Ways of Frugality, Gloucester, MA: The Somist Institute.
- Gorga, Carmine (2014).A Case for God: In Search of a Humanism Filled with True Human Beings, Gloucester, MA: The Somist Institute.

== See also ==
- Relationalism
- Joseph Kaipayil
- Raj Bhala
- Being
- Alfred North Whitehead
