= Paul Pfeiffer =

Paul Pfeiffer may refer to:

- Paul Pfeiffer (artist) (born 1966), American video artist
- Paul Pfeiffer (chemist) (1875–1951), German chemist
- Paul Pfeiffer, a fictional character from the television series The Wonder Years

== See also ==
- Paul Pfeifer, American jurist and politician
