= Pfeiffer effect =

The Pfeiffer effect is an optical phenomenon whereby the presence of an optically active compound influences the optical rotation of a racemic mixture of a second compound.

Racemic mixtures do not rotate plane polarized light, but the equilibrium concentration of the two enantiomers can shift from unity in the presence of a strongly interacting chiral species. Paul Pfeiffer, a student of Alfred Werner and inventor of the salen ligand, reported this phenomenon. The first example of the effect is credited to Eligio Perucca, who observed optical rotations in the visible part of the spectrum when crystals of sodium chlorate, which are chiral and colourless, were stained with a racemic dye. The effect is attributed to the interaction of the optically pure substance with the second coordination sphere of the racemate.
