= Gorga (surname) =

Gorga is an Italian surname that may refer to the following notable people:

- Carmine Gorga (born 1935), Italian political scientist
- Evan Gorga (1865–1957). Italian lyric tenor
- Melissa Gorga (born 1979), American television personality, author, singer, designer and businesswoman
- Sebastián Gorga (born 1994), Uruguayan football defender
- Teresa Giudice (born Gorga in 1972), American television personality, sister-in-law of Melissa
