= Atom localization =

Estimation of an atom's position

Atom localization deals with estimating the position of an atom using techniques of quantum optics with increasing precision. This field finds its origins in the thought experiment by Werner Heisenberg called Heisenberg's microscope, which is commonly used as an illustration of Heisenberg's Uncertainty relation in quantum mechanics textbooks. The techniques have matured enough to offer atom localization along all three spatial dimensions in the subwavelength domain. Atom localization techniques have been applied to other fields requiring precise control or measurement of the position of atom-like entities such as microscopy, nanolithography, optical trapping of atoms, optical lattices, and atom optics. Atom localization is based on employing atomic coherence to determine the position of the atom to a precision smaller than the wavelength of the light being used. This seemingly surpasses the Rayleigh limit of resolution and opens up possibilities of super-resolution for a variety of fields.

== Subwavelength atom localization: surpassing the Rayleigh limit ==
Given that in the discussion of the Heisenberg's microscope, Rayleigh limit of resolution and Heisenberg's Uncertainty are intricately related creates an impression that surpassing Rayleigh limit would lead to violation of Heisenberg's Uncertainty limit. It can be mathematically shown that the spatial resolution can be enhanced to any amount without violating Heisenberg's Uncertainty relation. The price to be paid is the momentum kick received by the particle whose position is being measured. This is depicted in the figure on the right.

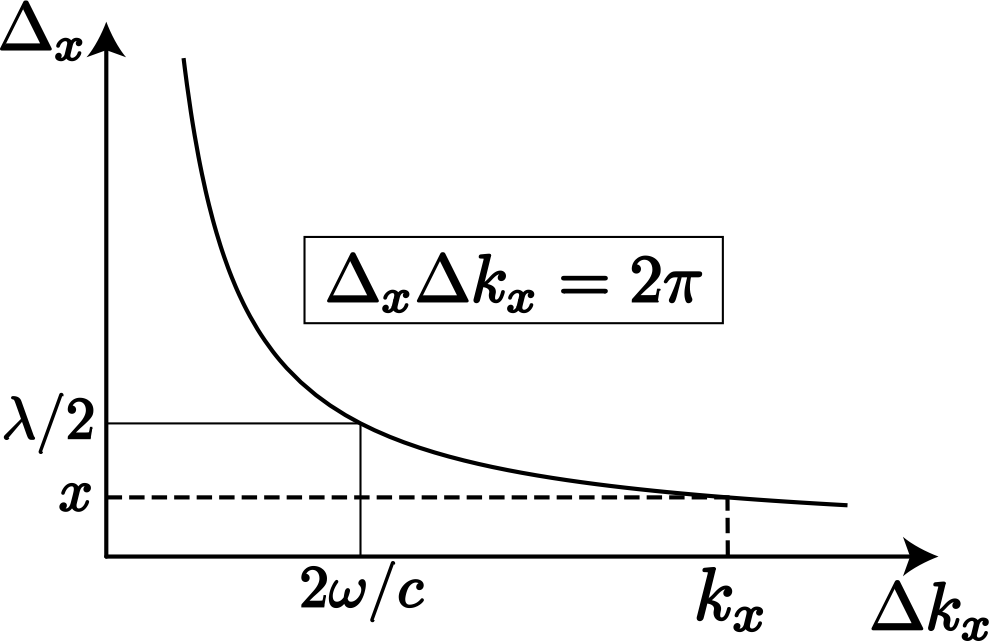

== One dimensional atom localization ==
Localization of an atom in a transverse direction from its direction of motion can be easily achieved using techniques such as quantum interference effects, coherent population trapping, via modification of atomic spectra such as through Autler-Towns Spectroscopy, resonance fluorescence, Ramsey interferometry, and via the monitoring of probe susceptibility through electromagnetically induced transparency, when the atom is interacting with at least one spatially-dependent standing wave field.

== Applications ==
The study of atom localization has offered practical applications to the area of nanolithography at the Heisenberg limit along with its fundamental importance to the areas of atom optics, and laser cooling and trapping of neutral atoms. Extending the atom localization schemes to two dimensions, optical lattices with tighter than usual confinement at each lattice point can be obtained. Such strongly confined lattice structures could be useful to study several predictions of the Bloch theory of solids, and Mott transitions in much cleaner systems as compared to conventional solids. Such tighter trapping potentials could have further applications to the area of quantum information specifically for the development of deterministic sources of single atoms and single-atom quantum register. Techniques of atom localization are also important to the subwavelength microscopy and imaging and determination of the center-of-mass wavefunction of atom-like entities.
