= Container space =

Theory that space can exist without matter

The container theory of space is a metaphysical theory according to which space is a background against which objects rest and move, with the implication that it can continue to exist in the absence of matter. Its opposite is the relational theory. Isaac Newton favoured absolute time and space and the container theory, against Gottfried Leibniz who was a relationist. The subject was famously debated with Samuel Clarke in the Leibniz–Clarke correspondence.

At first glance, the physical theory of relativity weighs in favour of relational space, but the general theory of relativity re-introduces some container-like features such as the possibility of completely empty universes.

An absolute approach can also be applied to time, with, for instance, the implication that there might have been vast epochs of time before the first event.

== See also ==
- René Descartes
- Philosophy of space and time
- Spacetime
- Time
- Theory of relativity
