= Universal wave function =

Quantum state of the entire universe

The universal wave function or the wave function of the universe is the wavefunction or quantum state of the entire universe. It is regarded as the basic physical entity in the many-worlds interpretation of quantum mechanics, and finds applications in quantum cosmology. It evolves deterministically according to a wave equation.

The concept of universal wave function was introduced by Hugh Everett III in his 1956 PhD thesis draft The Theory of the Universal Wave Function. It later received investigation from James Hartle and Stephen Hawking, who derived the Hartle–Hawking solution to the Wheeler–DeWitt equation to explain the initial conditions of the Big Bang cosmology.

== Role of observers ==
Hugh Everett's universal wavefunction supports the idea that observed and observer are all mixed together:

If we try to limit the applicability so as to exclude the measuring apparatus, or in general systems of macroscopic size, we are faced with the difficulty of sharply defining the region of validity. For what n might a group of n particles be construed as forming a measuring device so that the quantum description fails? And to draw the line at human or animal observers, i.e., to assume that all mechanical apparata obey the usual laws, but that they are not valid for living observers, does violence to the so-called principle of psycho-physical parallelism.

Eugene Wigner and John Archibald Wheeler take issue with this stance. Wigner wrote:

The state vector of my mind, even if it were completely known, would not give its impressions. A translation from state vector to impressions would be necessary; without such a translation the state vector would be meaningless.

Wheeler wrote:

One is led to recognize that a wave function 'encompassing the whole universe' is an idealization, formalistically perhaps a convenient idealization, but an idealization so strained that it can be used only in part in any forecast of correlations that makes physical sense. For making sense it seems essential most of all to 'leave the observer out of the wave function'.

== See also ==
- Heisenberg cut
- Wave function collapse
