= Leibniz–Clarke correspondence =

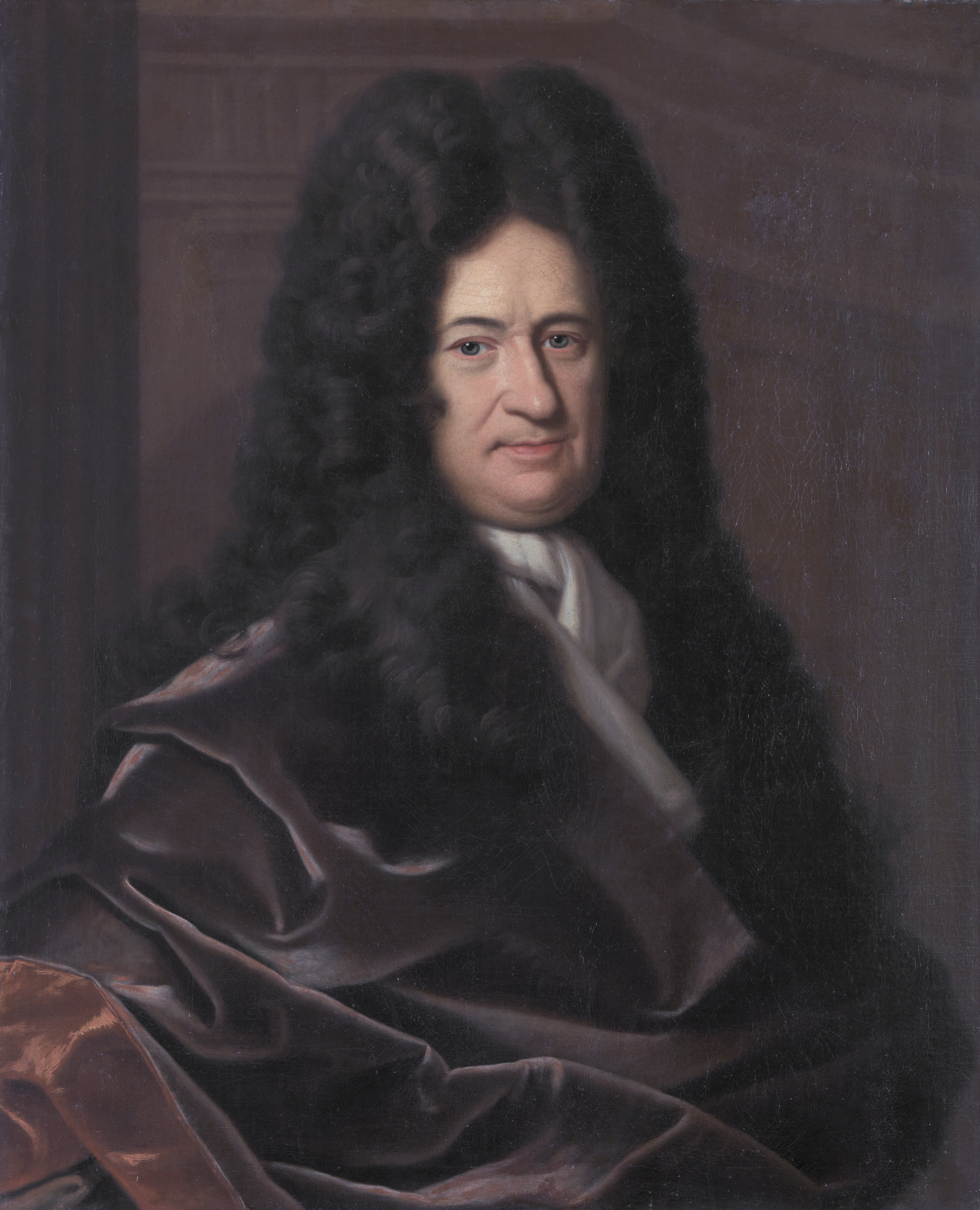
Gottfried Wilhelm Leibniz (1646–1716)

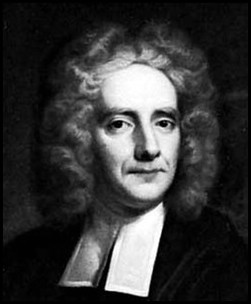
Samuel Clarke (1675–1729)

The Leibniz–Clarke correspondence was a scientific, theological and philosophical debate conducted in an exchange of letters between the German thinker Gottfried Wilhelm Leibniz and Samuel Clarke, an English supporter of Isaac Newton during the years 1715 and 1716. The exchange began because of a letter Leibniz wrote to Caroline of Ansbach, Princess of Wales, in which he remarked that Newtonian physics was detrimental to natural theology. Eager to defend the Newtonian view, Clarke responded, and the correspondence continued until the death of Leibniz in 1716.

Although a variety of subjects are touched on in the letters, the main interest for modern readers is in the dispute between the absolute theory of space favoured by Newton and Clarke, and Leibniz's relational approach. Also important is the conflict between Clarke's and Leibniz's opinions on free will and whether God must create the best of all possible worlds.

Leibniz had published only one book on moral matters, the Théodicée (1710), and his more metaphysical views had never been exposed to a sufficient extent, so the collected letters were met with interest by their contemporaries. The primary dispute between Leibniz and Newton about calculus was still fresh in the public's mind and it was taken as a matter of course that it was Newton himself who stood behind Clarke's replies.

== Editions ==
The Leibniz-Clarke letters were first published under Clarke's name in the year following Leibniz's death. Clarke wrote a preface, took care of the translation from French, added notes and some of his own writing. In 1720 Pierre Desmaizeaux published a similar volume in a French translation, including quotes from Newton's work. It is quite certain that for both editions the opinion of Newton himself has been sought and Leibniz left at a disadvantage. However the German translation of the correspondence published by Kohler, also in 1720, contained a reply to Clarke's last letter which Leibniz had not been able to answer, due to his death. The letters have been reprinted in most collections of Leibniz's works and regularly published in stand-alone editions. (Note: A full list is given in Alexander H., The Leibniz-Clarke Correspondence, with extracts from Newton's Principia and Opticks, edited with an introduction and notes, Manchester, 1955 (and reeditions); for a more recent edition see e.g. G. W. Leibniz and Samuel Clarke: Correspondence, Edited, with Introduction, by Roger Ariew, Hackett Publishing Co. Inc. Indianapolis/Cambridge, 2000.)

== See also ==
- Philosophy of space and time
- Principle of sufficient reason

== Sources ==
- Leroy, Georg Victor (1893). Die philosophischen Probleme im Briefwechsel zwischen Leibniz und Clarke. Giessen: Joh. Falk III. Söhne.
- Vailati, Ezio (1997). Leibniz and Clarke: A Study of Their Correspondence. Oxford: Oxford University Press. ISBN 9780195113990.
- Rowe, William L. (2004). Can God Be Free?. Oxford University Press. ISBN 0198250452.
