= Joseph Kaipayil =

Indian philosopher (born 1959)

Joseph Kaipayil (born 1959) is an Indian philosopher, who expounds a relationalist theory of reality. He is professor of philosophy at Jeevalaya Institute of Philosophy, Bangalore. In his writings one finds a sustained and systematic articulation of relationalism as a distinct philosophical theory. His works include: The Epistemology of Comparative Philosophy (1995), Critical Ontology: An Introductory Essay (2002), Human as Relational: A Study in Critical Ontology (2003), An Essay on Ontology (2008), and Relationalism: A Theory of Being (2009).

== Critical ontology, ontic relationalism, and Being-principle ==
Critical ontology, ontic relationalism, and Being-principle are the three major concepts found in Kaipayil's thought.

Building on his basic understanding of philosophy as critical reflection on human experience (to form a rational theory of the world), Kaipayil argues that ontology, the theory of being, (and metaphysics for that matter) should be “critical,” meaning that it should be based on empirical experience. Any ontological and metaphysical postulations we make can claim epistemic justification, only if they are grounded in our experience of the world. In this regard, he agrees with the Kantian critique of human knowledge, without, however, endorsing its agnosticism about metaphysics. Kaipayil further describes ontology as investigation of the being-principle of things.

Coming to his relationalist thought, Kaipayil presents relationalism mainly as a theory of being, which addresses the metaphysical problem of the one and the many, i.e. the unity and the plurality of the world. His theory of being, which he prefers to call ontic relationalism, interprets the meaning of being in terms of the particular in its relationality. Entities are constituted by their multiple relationalities. According to ontic relationalism, particulars interrelate and constitute what we call reality.

Integral to Kaipayil's theory of being is his concept of Being-principle, conceived as the unity of the three primal principles - existence, intelligence, and force. Beings (particulars) are thought to be ontologically grounded in Being-principle, the supreme particular, and its radical relationality.

== Interpretation of Indian philosophy ==
Kaipayil critiques the traditional view of classical Indian philosophy as intuitive and spiritual (in contrast with Western philosophy). Following the lead of Daya Krishna and J.N. Mohanty among others, Kaipayil argues that philosophy in India was equally rational and critical a pursuit as it was in the West. Kaipayil also questions the philosophical rationale of the faith-based classification of classical schools into orthodox and heterodox and the feasibility of comparative philosophy as a model for philosophizing.
