= Complementarity (physics) =

Quantum physics concept

In physics, complementarity is a conceptual aspect of quantum mechanics that Niels Bohr regarded as an essential feature of the theory. The complementarity principle holds that certain pairs of complementary properties cannot all be observed or measured simultaneously. For example, position and momentum, frequency and lifetime, or optical phase and photon number. In contemporary terms, complementarity encompasses both the uncertainty principle and wave-particle duality.

Bohr considered one of the foundational truths of quantum mechanics to be the fact that setting up an experiment to measure one quantity of a pair, for instance the position of an electron, excludes the possibility of measuring the other, yet understanding both experiments is necessary to characterize the object under study. In Bohr's view, the behavior of atomic and subatomic objects cannot be separated from the measuring instruments that create the context in which the measured objects behave. Consequently, there is no "single picture" that unifies the results obtained in these different experimental contexts, and only the "totality of the phenomena" together can provide a completely informative description.

== History ==
=== Background ===
Complementarity as a physical model derives from Niels Bohr's 1927 lecture during the Como Conference in Italy, at a scientific celebration of the work of Alessandro Volta 100 years previous. Bohr's subject was complementarity, the idea that measurements of quantum events provide complementary information through seemingly contradictory results. While Bohr's presentation was not well received, it did crystallize the issues ultimately leading to the modern wave-particle duality concept. The contradictory results that triggered Bohr's ideas had been building up over the previous 20 years.

This contradictory evidence came both from light and from electrons. The wave theory of light, broadly successful for over a hundred years, had been challenged by Planck's 1901 model of blackbody radiation and Einstein's 1905 interpretation of the photoelectric effect. These theoretical models use discrete energy, a quantum, to describe the interaction of light with matter. Despite confirmation by various experimental observations, the photon theory (as it came to be called later) remained controversial until Arthur Compton performed a series of experiments from 1922 to 1924 demonstrating the momentum of light. The experimental evidence of particle-like momentum seemingly contradicted other experiments demonstrating the wave-like interference of light.

The contradictory evidence from electrons arrived in the opposite order. Many experiments by J. J. Thompson, Robert Millikan, and Charles Wilson, among others, had shown that free electrons had particle properties. However, in 1924, Louis de Broglie proposed that electrons had an associated wave and Schrödinger demonstrated that wave equations accurately account for electron properties in atoms. Again some experiments showed particle properties and others wave properties.

Bohr's resolution of these contradictions is to accept them. In his Como lecture he says: "our interpretation of the experimental material rests essentially upon the classical concepts." Direct observation being impossible, observations of quantum effects are necessarily classical. Whatever the nature of quantum events, our only information will arrive via classical results. If experiments sometimes produce wave results and sometimes particle results, that is the nature of light and of the ultimate constituents of matter.

=== Bohr's lectures ===
Niels Bohr apparently conceived of the principle of complementarity during a skiing vacation in Norway in February and March 1927, during which he received a letter from Werner Heisenberg regarding an as-yet-unpublished result, a thought experiment about a microscope using gamma rays. This thought experiment implied a tradeoff between uncertainties that would later be formalized as the uncertainty principle. To Bohr, Heisenberg's paper did not make clear the distinction between a position measurement merely disturbing the momentum value that a particle carried and the more radical idea that momentum was meaningless or undefinable in a context where position was measured instead. Upon returning from his vacation, by which time Heisenberg had already submitted his paper for publication, Bohr convinced Heisenberg that the uncertainty tradeoff was a manifestation of the deeper concept of complementarity. Heisenberg duly appended a note to this effect to his paper, before its publication, stating:

Bohr has brought to my attention [that] the uncertainty in our observation does not arise exclusively from the occurrence of discontinuities, but is tied directly to the demand that we ascribe equal validity to the quite different experiments which show up in the [particulate] theory on one hand, and in the wave theory on the other hand.

Bohr publicly introduced the principle of complementarity in a lecture he delivered on 16 September 1927 at the International Physics Congress held in Como, Italy, attended by most of the leading physicists of the era, with the notable exceptions of Einstein, Schrödinger, and Dirac. However, these three were in attendance one month later when Bohr again presented the principle at the Fifth Solvay Congress in Brussels, Belgium. The lecture was published in the proceedings of both of these conferences, and was republished the following year in Naturwissenschaften (in German) and in Nature (in English).

In his original lecture on the topic, Bohr pointed out that just as the finitude of the speed of light implies the impossibility of a sharp separation between space and time (relativity), the finitude of the quantum of action implies the impossibility of a sharp separation between the behavior of a system and its interaction with the measuring instruments and leads to the well-known difficulties with the concept of 'state' in quantum theory; the notion of complementarity is intended to capture this new situation in epistemology created by quantum theory. Physicists F.A.M. Frescura and Basil Hiley have summarized the reasons for the introduction of the principle of complementarity in physics as follows:

In the traditional view, it is assumed that there exists a reality in space-time and that this reality is a given thing, all of whose aspects can be viewed or articulated at any given moment. Bohr was the first to point out that quantum mechanics called this traditional outlook into question. To him the "indivisibility of the quantum of action" [...] implied that not all aspects of a system can be viewed simultaneously. By using one particular piece of apparatus only certain features could be made manifest at the expense of others, while with a different piece of apparatus another complementary aspect could be made manifest in such a way that the original set became non-manifest, that is, the original attributes were no longer well defined. For Bohr, this was an indication that the principle of complementarity, a principle that he had previously known to appear extensively in other intellectual disciplines but which did not appear in classical physics, should be adopted as a universal principle.

=== Debate following the lectures ===
Complementarity was a central feature of Bohr's reply to the EPR paradox, an attempt by Albert Einstein, Boris Podolsky and Nathan Rosen to argue that quantum particles must have position and momentum even without being measured and so quantum mechanics must be an incomplete theory. The thought experiment proposed by Einstein, Podolsky and Rosen involved producing two particles and sending them far apart. The experimenter could choose to measure either the position or the momentum of one particle. Given that result, they could in principle make a precise prediction of what the corresponding measurement on the other, faraway particle would find. To Einstein, Podolsky and Rosen, this implied that the faraway particle must have precise values of both quantities whether or not that particle is measured in any way. Bohr argued in response that the deduction of a position value could not be transferred over to the situation where a momentum value is measured, and vice versa.

Later expositions of complementarity by Bohr include a 1938 lecture in Warsaw and a 1949 article written for a festschrift honoring Albert Einstein. It was also covered in a 1953 essay by Bohr's collaborator Léon Rosenfeld.

== Mathematical formalism ==
For Bohr, complementarity was the "ultimate reason" behind the uncertainty principle. All attempts to grapple with atomic phenomena using classical physics were eventually frustrated, he wrote, leading to the recognition that those phenomena have "complementary aspects". But classical physics can be generalized to address this, and with "astounding simplicity", by describing physical quantities using non-commutative algebra. This mathematical expression of complementarity builds on the work of Hermann Weyl and Julian Schwinger, starting with Hilbert spaces and unitary transformation, leading to the theorems of mutually unbiased bases.

In the mathematical formulation of quantum mechanics, physical quantities that classical mechanics had treated as real-valued variables become self-adjoint operators on a Hilbert space. These operators, called "observables", can fail to commute, in which case they are called "incompatible":
$$\left[\hat{A}, \hat{B}\right] := \hat{A}\hat{B} - \hat{B}\hat{A} \neq \hat{0}.$$
Incompatible observables cannot have a complete set of common eigenstates; there can be some simultaneous eigenstates of $\hat{A}$ and $\hat{B}$, but not enough in number to constitute a complete basis. The canonical commutation relation
$$\left[\hat{x}, \hat{p}\right] = i\hbar$$
implies that this applies to position and momentum. In a Bohrian view, this is a mathematical statement that position and momentum are complementary aspects. Likewise, an analogous relationship holds for any two of the spin observables defined by the Pauli matrices; measurements of spin along perpendicular axes are complementary. The Pauli spin observables are defined for a quantum system described by a two-dimensional Hilbert space; mutually unbiased bases generalize these observables to Hilbert spaces of arbitrary finite dimension. Two bases $\{|a_j\rangle\}$ and $\{|b_k\rangle\}$ for an $N$-dimensional Hilbert space are mutually unbiased when
$$|\langle a_j|b_k \rangle|^2 = \frac{1}{N}\ \text{for all}\ j, k = 1, ... N-1.$$

Here the basis vector $a_1$, for example, has the same overlap with every $b_k$; there is equal transition probability between a state in one basis and any state in the other basis. Each basis corresponds to an observable, and the observables for two mutually unbiased bases are complementary to each other. This leads to a definition of 'Principle of Complementarity' as:

For each degree of freedom the dynamical variables are a pair of complementary observables.

The concept of complementarity has also been applied to quantum measurements described by positive-operator-valued measures (POVMs).

== Continuous complementarity ==
While the concept of complementarity can be discussed via two experimental extremes, continuous tradeoff is also possible. In 1979 Wooters and Zurek introduced an information-theoretic treatment of the double-slit experiment providing on approach to a quantiative model of complementarity. The wave-particle relation, introduced by Daniel Greenberger and Allaine Yasin in 1988, and since then refined by others, quantifies the trade-off between measuring particle path distinguishability, $D$, and wave interference fringe visibility, $V$:
$$D^2 + V^2\ \le\ 1$$
The values of $D$ and $V$ can vary between 0 and 1 individually, but any experiment that combines particle and wave detection will limit one or the other, or both. The detailed definition of the two terms vary among applications, but the relation expresses the verified constraint that efforts to detect particle paths will result in less visible wave interference.

== Modern role ==
While many of the early discussions of complementarity discussed hypothetical experiments, advances in technology have allowed advanced tests of this concept. Experiments like the quantum eraser verify the key ideas in complementarity; modern exploration of quantum entanglement builds directly on complementarity:

The most sensible position, according to quantum mechanics, is to assume that no such waves preexist before any measurement.

— Anton Zeilinger

In his Nobel lecture, physicist Julian Schwinger linked complementarity to quantum field theory:

Indeed, relativistic quantum mechanics—the union of the complementarity principle of Bohr with the relativity principle of Einstein—is quantum field theory.

— Julian Schwinger

The Consistent histories interpretation of quantum mechanics takes a generalized form of complementarity as a key defining postulate.

== See also ==
- Copenhagen interpretation
- Canonical coordinates
- Conjugate variables
- Interpretations of quantum mechanics
- Wave–particle duality
