= Quirino Majorana =

Italian physicist (1871–1957)

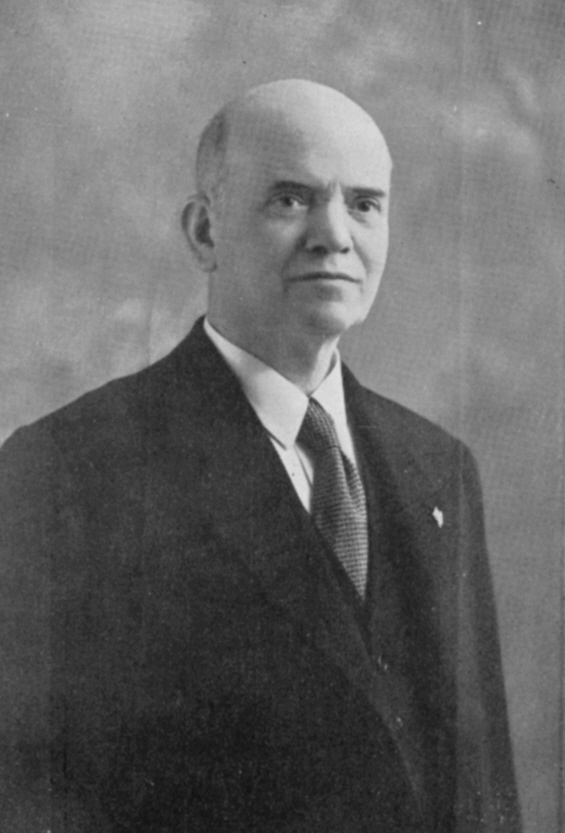
- Born: 28 October 1871; Catania, Italy
- Died: 31 July 1957 (aged 85); Rieti, Italy
- Relatives: Ettore Majorana (nephew)
- Scientific career
- Fields: Experimental physics
- Workplaces: University of Rome; University of Turin; University of Bologna
- Doctoral students: Bruno Rossi

Quirino Francesco Valentino Majorana (28 October 1871 – 31 July 1957) was an Italian experimental physicist who investigated a wide range of phenomena during his long career as professor of physics at the Universities of Rome, the Polytechnic University of Turin (1916–1921), and the University of Bologna (1921–1934).

== Work ==
Majorana performed a long series of very sensitive gravity shielding experiments from 1918 to 1922, which have never been reproduced. Majorana's experiments determined that mercury or lead around a suspended lead sphere acted as a screen and slightly decreased the Earth's gravitational pull. No attempts have been made to reproduce his results using the same experimental techniques. Other researchers have concluded from other data that if gravitational absorption does exist, it must be at least five orders of magnitude smaller than Majorana's experiments suggest.

Critical of Albert Einstein's relativity theory, Majorana tried to disprove Einstein’s postulate on the constancy of the speed of light, but he failed, and therefore his experiments confirmed Einstein's postulate. Majorana also confirmed Isaac Newton’s law of universal gravitation to high precision.

His later work at the University of Bologna was influenced by correspondence with his nephew Ettore Majorana (1906–1938), another physicist.

In 1927, he was the organizer of the Como Conference, celebrating the centennial anniversary of the death of Alessandro Volta.

Majorana also discovered the magneto-optic Kerr effect in non-ferrous metals like silver, gold and aluminium. A thousand times more weak than the usual effect.

== Selected publications ==
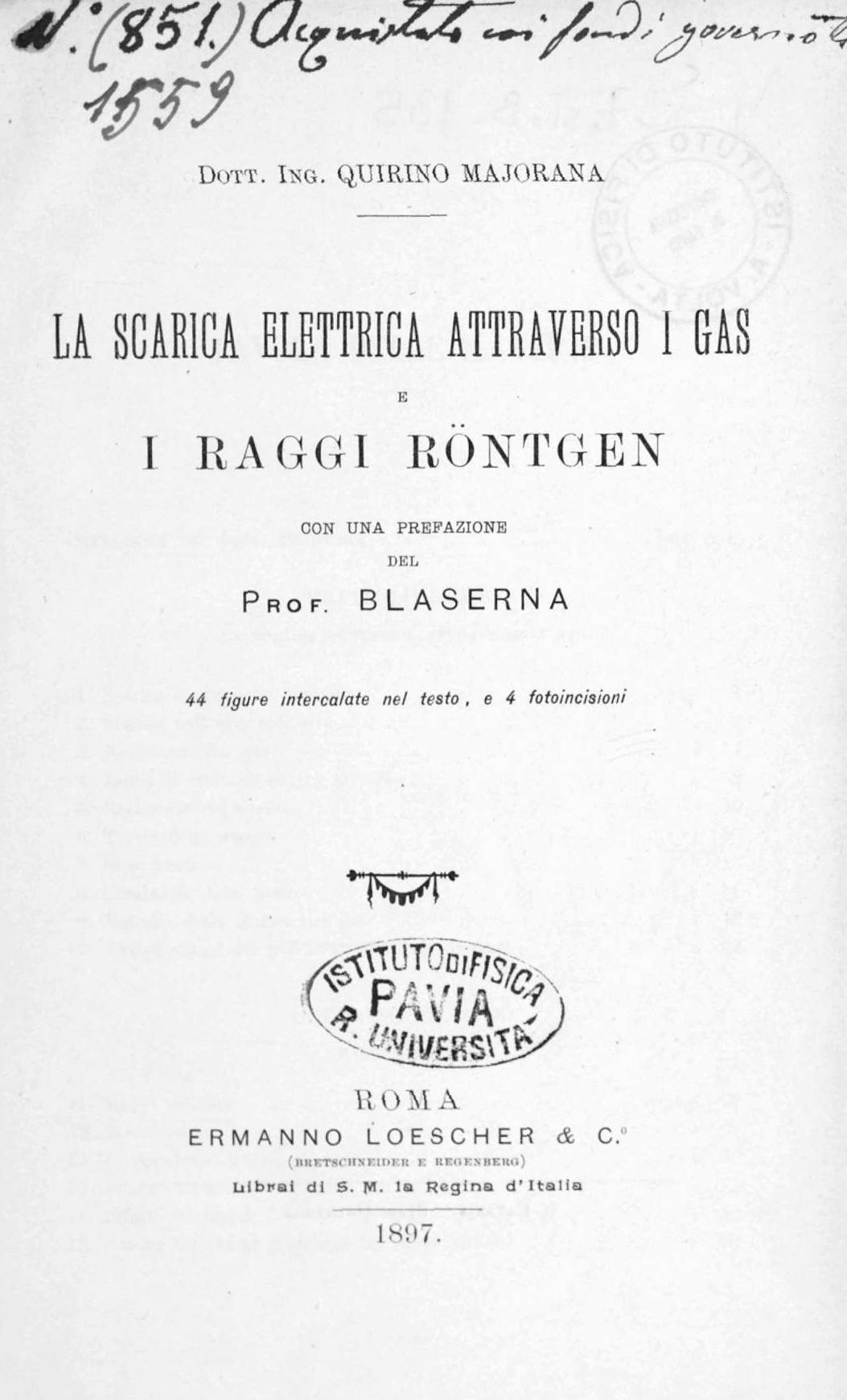
Scarica elettrica attraverso i gas e i raggi Röntgen, 1897

- Scarica elettrica attraverso i gas e i raggi Röntgen (in Italian). Roma: Loescher. 1897.
- Quirino Majorana, "Su di un fenomeno fotoelettrico constabile con gli audion," Rendiconti Accademia dei Lincei, V7, pp. 801–806 (1928).
- Quirino Majorana, "Azione della luce su sottili lamine metalliche," La Ricerca Scientifica National Research Council, V1 (1935).
- Quirino Majorana, "Agli albori dell'eletricità. Galvani e la scienza moderna," Sapere, pp. 261–265 (Oct 1937).
- Quirino Majorana, "Ulteriori ricerche sull'azione della luce su sottili lamine metallische," Il Nuovo Cimento, V15, pp. 573–593 (1938).
