= Eligio Perucca =

Italian chemist (1890–1965)

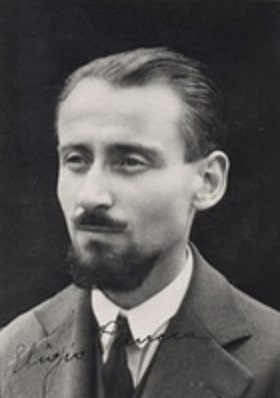
- Born: March 28, 1890; Potenza, Italy
- Died: January 5, 1965 (aged 74); Rome, Italy
- Education: University of Pisa
- Scientific career
- Fields: Chemistry; Stereochemistry
- Workplaces: University of Turin

Eligio Perucca (28 March 1890– 5 January 1965) was an Italian physics instructor and researcher at the University of Turin in Italy in the early decades of the twentieth century. He later served a professorship at the nearby Polytechnic University of Turin. He discovered an important principle in stereochemistry in 1919, but his contribution was overlooked and forgotten until recently.

== Life and career ==
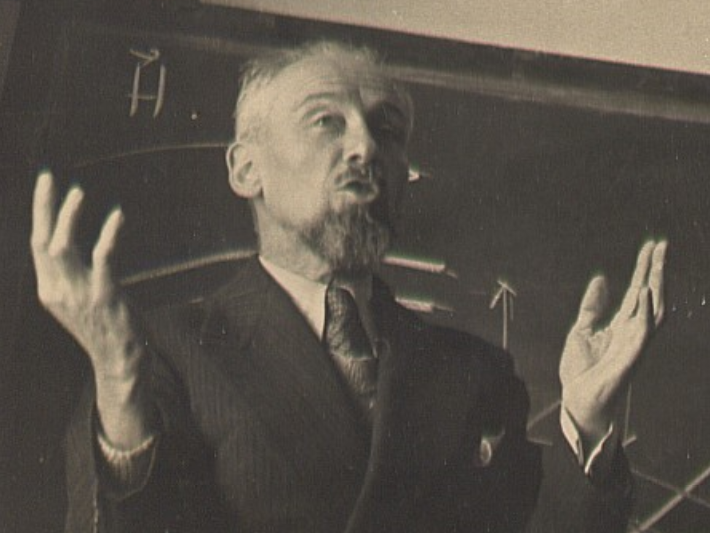
Eligio Perucca lecturing.

Perucca received a Ph.D. degree in physics from the University of Pisa at the astoundingly young age of 20. He became Assistant to Professor Naccari in 1911 at the University of Turin, a post he retained for 11 years.

In 1922 Perucca succeeded Quirino Majorana to the chair of Experimental Physics at the Polytechnic University of Turin. He retained that appointment until 1960. In addition he was Rector of the Polytechnic from 1947–1955, and largely devoted his energy to rebuilding the physical facilities which had been destroyed during World War II.

== Scientific achievements ==
Upon arriving at the University of Turin, Perucca launched into the study of polarized light. In 1913 he invented a sensitive light meter known as the Bilamina de Bravais-Perucca, which is still highly regarded for its precision.

In a paper published in 1919, Perucca reported an experiment which produced optical rotatory dispersion (ORD) as a result of passing linearly polarized light through colored crystals of sodium chlorate. Perucca was attempting to replicate a nineteenth-century experiment (1860) in which amethyst exhibited optical activity in the visible light spectrum. He used a readily-available substitute for the amethyst. Sodium chlorate is chiral as a crystal, but in its natural (undyed) state is transparent and does not exhibit enhanced optical activity, so Perucca added an organic dye (an equilibrium racemic mixture of a triarylmethane textile dye then known as extra China blue). His goal was to see if addition of the organic dye on the crystalline structure would induce enhanced optical activity (rotation) of light in the 500-600 nm absorption band on the otherwise optically inactive dye.

Perucca reported that the dyed crystal did exhibit the desired optical rotation. However, because his report was not widely distributed, his discovery of this stereochemistry effect was not attributed to him, and when it was later studied by Paul Pfeiffer in Germany beginning in 1931 and reported in the literature, the effect eventually became known as the Pfeiffer effect.

Perucca's experiment was the forerunner of another field of study which arose in the 1970s, in connection with enantioselective adsorption of racemic mixtures on inorganic crystals. This study was a basic tool in determining the origin of the homochirality of life - scientists are still trying to determine why present earth-based life is based almost exclusively on L-enantiomers, popularly known as left-handed proteins.

During his tenure at the Turin Polytechnic, Perucca studied the Volta Effect, measuring with high precision the electronegativity between pairs of dissimilar metals. He was able to establish a theoretical correlation between the Volta Effect and the Peltier effect. In 1928 he discovered that Enrico Fermi's theory on the Fermi gas could be used to predict the constants of the photoelectric effect and thermionic effect in Volta's and Peltier's equations.

In 1930 Perucca turned his attention to the photoelectric effect. He developed a new type of electric-current/voltage measuring device called the Elettrometro di Perucca which was highly sensitive.

== Replication of experimental result (Nuovo Cimento) ==
In 2001, University of Washington chemistry professor Bart E. Kahr determined to compile a complete list of studies on crystal dyeing. He happened upon Perucca's nearly-forgotten paper. After studying and researching the subject, Kahr and associates Yonghong Bing and Werner Kaminsky repeated the experiment in 2008, using aniline blue as the dyeing compound. They did confirm the 1919 result. Kahr stated:

"Perucca's paper should be viewed as a milestone in the chiroptics literature, as well as in the history of enantioselective chemistry."

== Perucca's reputation ==
Perucca labored as a government employee during the fascist regime of Benito Mussolini. However, his associates remember him as strongly anti-fascist, not a safe viewpoint in those days. In 1939 Perucca received Mussolini during an official visit to Turin. Rather than donning the black attire which the Duce's supporters affected in his presence, Perucca made "a bold political statement" by wearing fancy ceremonial attire to the meeting.

Perucca once demanded that a student describe the Carnot cycle during an oral examination. The flustered student was unable to comply, so the professor directed him to draw a circle on the blackboard. He then directed him to draw another circle of equal size nearby. He then said the student had drawn a "Carnot bicycle", that he should get on and ride away, because he had failed the exam.

Perucca once asked a chemistry student why the laboratory's washbasins were located one meter above the laboratory's floor. The confused student stumbled through possibilities such as necessary hydraulic force or sanitary requirements. But Perucca failed the already demoralized student and explained that the basins were so located in order to allow the workers to wash their hands while standing up.
