= Relational space =

Metaphysical theory

The relational theory of space is a metaphysical theory according to which space is composed of relations between objects, with the implication that it cannot exist in the absence of matter. Its opposite is the container theory. A relativistic physical theory implies a relational metaphysics, but not the other way round: even if space is composed of nothing but relations between observers and events, it would be conceptually possible for all observers to agree on their measurements, whereas relativity implies they will disagree. Newtonian physics can be cast in relational terms, but Newton insisted, for philosophical reasons, on absolute (container) space. The subject was famously debated by Gottfried Wilhelm Leibniz and a supporter of Newton's in the Leibniz–Clarke correspondence.

An absolute approach can also be applied to time, with, for instance, the implication that there might have been vast epochs of time before the first event.

== See also ==
- René Descartes
- Philosophy of space and time
- Spacetime
