= Paul Pfeiffer (chemist) =

German chemist (1875–1951)

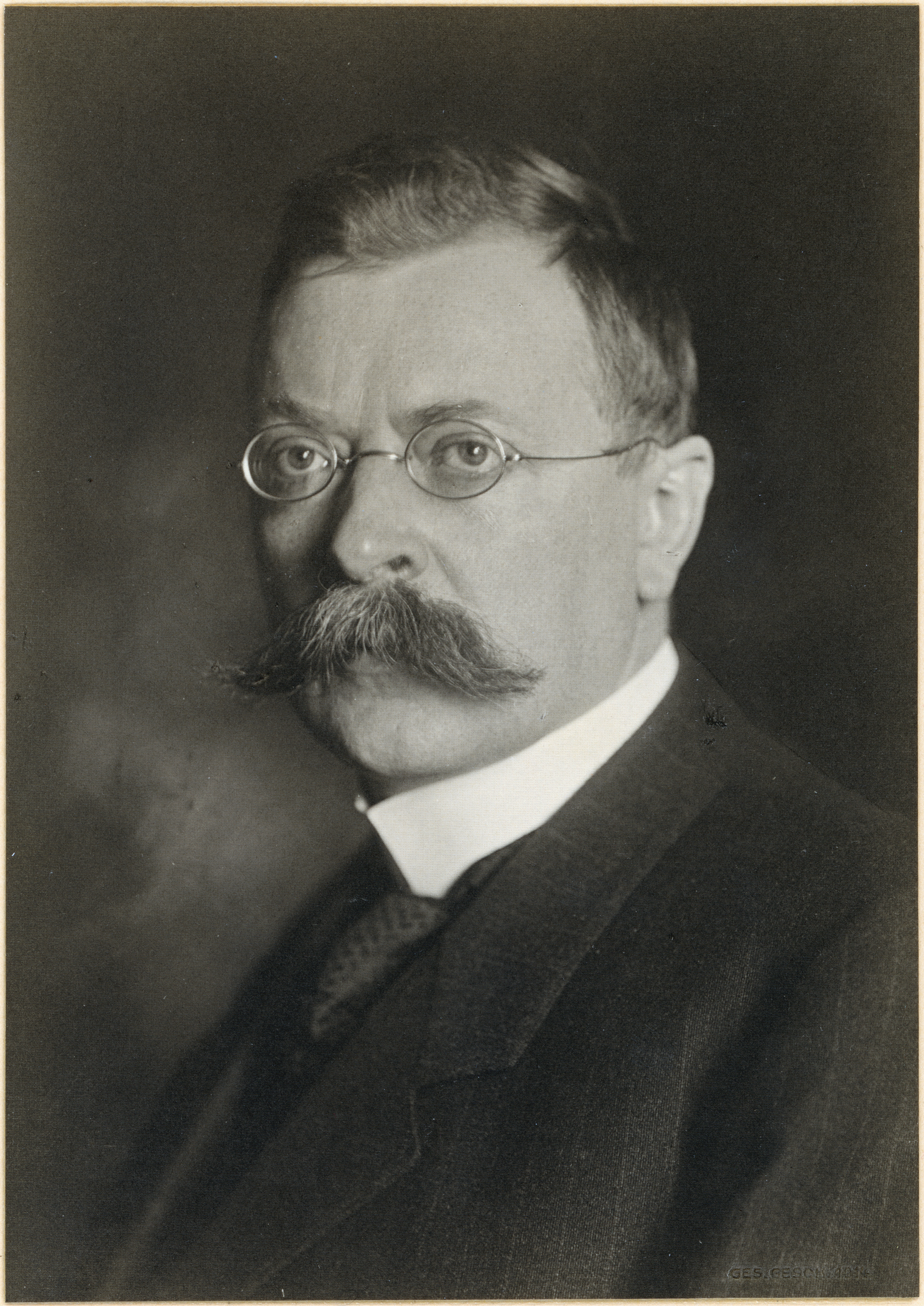
Paul Pfeiffer

Paul Pfeiffer (21 April 1875 – 4 March 1951) was an influential German chemist. He received his Ph.D. at the University of Zurich, studying under Alfred Werner, the "father of coordination chemistry". His thesis, submitted in 1898, dealt with adducts of tin halides. Pfeiffer was considered Werner's most successful student and became Werner's assistant until, due to a dispute with his mentor, he left first for Rostock, then Karlsruhe, and finally Bonn. At Bonn, where he had studied as an undergraduate, he occupied Kekulé's chair.

Pfeiffer's work spanned many themes. The Pfeiffer effect, which involves interactions between chiral solutes, is named after his discoveries. His group first made the salen ligands, which gave the first artificial oxygen carriers. He recognized that crystals, e.g. of zinc sulfide, are large molecules.
