= Absolute theory =

Theory that objects exist independently

In philosophy, absolute theory (or absolutism) usually refers to a theory based on concepts (such as the concept of space) that exist independently of other concepts and objects. The absolute point of view was advocated in physics by Isaac Newton. It is one of the traditional views of space along with relational theory and the Kantian theory.

== Overview ==
According to the absolute theory of space, it is a homogeneous structure which exists and is independent of other things. The Newtonian arguments of this theory, particularly those concerned with the ontological status of space and time, had been related to the existence of God through the concepts of absolute space and absolute time. It was proposed that the universe was finite in extent and was said to have begun in time. Additionally, space exists prior to the body or matter that occupies it and it was held that the universe – as a finite object – is situated within it.

The theory was also promoted by Newton's followers including Samuel Clarke and Roger Cotes during the 17th and 18th centuries.

== Related theories ==
An absolute theory is the opposite of a relational theory. Gottfried Wilhelm Leibniz, the main proponent of relational theory, argued that there is no absolute space and time. He maintained that space is not independent nor a container of the matter that occupies it, explaining that physical objects or forces are ordered spatially and that space is merely a system of relations. According to the relational theory, without objects, there is no space.

Martin Heidegger's theory of space also opposes the absolute theory, with the criticism that it is founded on metaphysical dichotomy of separated subject and object. He maintained that this nature keeps absolute theory from explaining the true nature of space.
