= Paolo Straneo =

Italian physicist (1874–1968)

Paolo Pietro Straneo (19 June 1874, in Genoa – 24 November 1968, in Genoa) was an Italian mathematical physicist.

== Biography ==
Straneo studied at ETH Zurich, where he met and was a friend of Albert Einstein. In 1897 he received his Ph.D. in natural philosophy of the University of Zurich. From 1899 he was a libero docente (Privatdocent) in mathematical physics and for some years he was a docente incaricato (lecturer without tenure) in mathematical physics at the University of Turin. After a period of working as a libero professionista (an engineering consultant or a freelancer performing work similar to that of a libero docente), in 1924 he again became a libero docente and was put in charge of mathematical physics at the University of Genoa. There, from 1925 he was a professor ordinarius in mathematical physics and also taught theoretical physics.

He did research on mathematical physics, in particular, the theory of relativity.

He contributed to the Enciclopedia Hoepli delle Matematiche elementari the articles: Teoria generale delle dimensioni fisiche (General theory of physical dimensions) and Materia, irraggiamento e fisica quantistica (Matter, radiation and quantum physics).

Straneo was an Invited Speaker at the International Congress of Mathematicians in 1928 in Bologna and in 1932 in Zürich. He was elected a member of the Accademia nazionale dei Lincei.

The Atti dei LIncei contains in recent numbers two somewhat closely allied papers on thermo-electricity. The first of these is a verification of the principle of thermodynamic equivalence for bimetallic conductors, by Signor Paolo Straneo, who concludes not only that thermo-electric phenomena proceed regularly in perfect accord with theory, but they can be studied with sufficient exactness by temperature observations without recourse to calorimetry. The determination of the Peltier-effect coefficient by the author's method succeeds even in the case in which previous methods are wanting in accuracy, namely, when the two metals possess a high specific resistance and a feeble Peltier-effect. With the present method, the Joule effect only slightly affects the phenomenon under consideration. Signor Straneo's method forms the basis of a paper by Signor A. Pochettino on variations of the Peltier-effect in a magnetic field. The value of the Peltier-effect was observed to vary with the magnetisation.

== Selected publications ==
- Intorno alla teoria dei quanti, Roma, 1931.
- Compendio delle lezioni di fisica teorica, Libreria Internazionale Di Stefano, Genova, 1944; 472 pages.
- Cinquant'anni di relatività. 1905-1955 (with Antonio Aliotta, Giuseppe Armellini, Piero Caldirola, Bruno Finzi, Giovanni Polvani, Francesco Severi), foreword by Albert Einstein. Edizioni Giuntine e Sansoni Editore, Firenze, 1955.
- Le teorie della fisica nel loro sviluppo storico, ed. Morcelliana, Brescia, 1959; 449 pages.
