= Copenhagen interpretation =

Interpretation of quantum mechanics

The Copenhagen interpretation is a collection of views about the meaning of quantum mechanics, stemming from the work of Niels Bohr, Werner Heisenberg, Max Born, and others. While the name "Copenhagen" refers to the city where Bohr and Heisenberg worked, its use as an interpretation was apparently coined by Heisenberg during the 1950s to refer to ideas developed in the 1925–1927 period, glossing over his disagreements with Bohr. Consequently, there is no definitive historical statement of what the interpretation entails.

Features common across versions of the Copenhagen interpretation include the idea that quantum mechanics is intrinsically indeterministic, with probabilities calculated using the Born rule, and the principle of complementarity, which states that objects have certain pairs of complementary properties that cannot all be observed or measured simultaneously. Moreover, the act of "observing" or "measuring" an object is irreversible, and no truth can be attributed to an object except according to the results of its measurement (that is, the Copenhagen interpretation rejects counterfactual definiteness). Copenhagen-type interpretations hold that quantum descriptions are objective, in that they are independent of physicists' personal beliefs and other arbitrary mental factors.

Over the years, there have been many objections to aspects of Copenhagen-type interpretations, including the discontinuous and stochastic nature of the "observation" or "measurement" process, the difficulty of defining what might count as a measuring device, and the seeming reliance upon classical physics in describing such devices. Still, including all the variations, the interpretation remains one of the most commonly taught.

== Background ==
Starting in 1900, investigations into atomic and subatomic phenomena forced a revision to the basic concepts of classical physics. However, it was not until a quarter-century had elapsed that the revision reached the status of a coherent theory. During the intervening period, now known as the time of the "old quantum theory", physicists worked with approximations and heuristic corrections to classical physics. Notable results from this period include Max Planck's calculation of the blackbody radiation spectrum, Albert Einstein's explanation of the photoelectric effect, Einstein and Peter Debye's work on the specific heat of solids, Niels Bohr and Hendrika Johanna van Leeuwen's proof that classical physics cannot account for diamagnetism, Bohr's model of the hydrogen atom and Arnold Sommerfeld's extension of the Bohr model to include relativistic effects. From 1922 through 1925, this method of heuristic corrections encountered increasing difficulties; for example, the Bohr–Sommerfeld model could not be extended from hydrogen to the next simplest case, the helium atom.

The transition from the old quantum theory to full-fledged quantum physics began in 1925, when Werner Heisenberg presented a treatment of electron behavior based on discussing only "observable" quantities, meaning to Heisenberg the frequencies of light that atoms absorbed and emitted. Max Born then realized that in Heisenberg's theory, the classical variables of position and momentum would instead be represented by matrices, mathematical objects that can be multiplied together like numbers with the crucial difference that the order of multiplication matters. Erwin Schrödinger presented an equation that treated the electron as a wave, and Born discovered that the way to successfully interpret the wave function that appeared in the Schrödinger equation was as a tool for calculating probabilities.

Quantum mechanics cannot easily be reconciled with everyday language and observation, and has often seemed counter-intuitive to physicists, including its inventors. (Note: As Heisenberg wrote in Physics and Philosophy (1958): "I remember discussions with Bohr which went through many hours till very late at night and ended almost in despair; and when at the end of the discussion I went alone for a walk in the neighbouring park I repeated to myself again and again the question: Can nature possibly be so absurd as it seemed to us in these atomic experiments?") The ideas grouped together as the Copenhagen interpretation suggest a way to think about how the mathematics of quantum theory relates to physical reality.

== Origin and use of the term ==
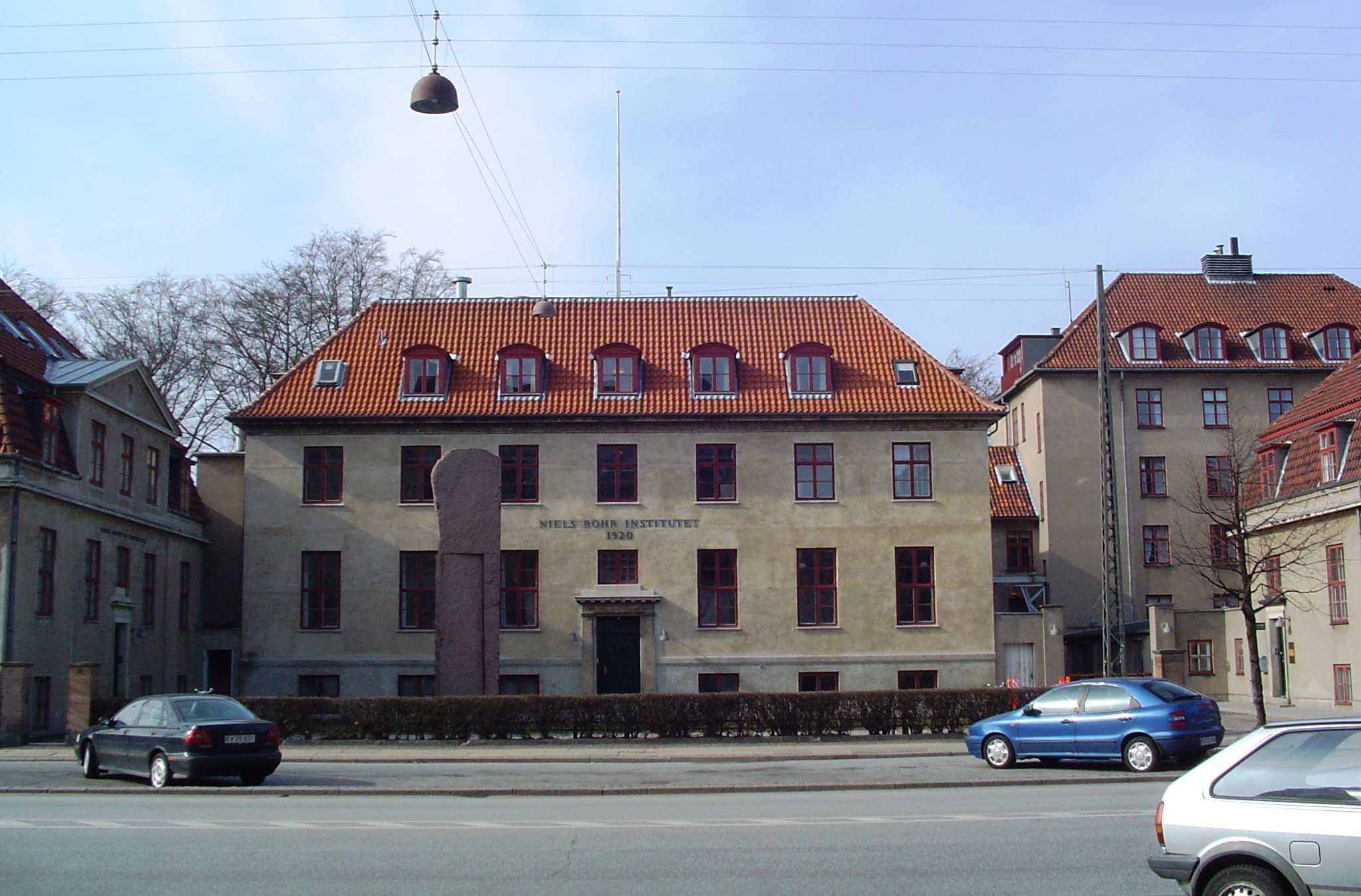
The Niels Bohr Institute in Copenhagen

The 'Copenhagen' part of the term refers to the city of Copenhagen in Denmark. During the mid-1920s, Heisenberg had been an assistant to Bohr at his institute in Copenhagen. Together they helped originate quantum mechanical theory. At the 1927 Solvay Conference, a dual talk by Max Born and Heisenberg declared "we consider quantum mechanics to be a closed theory, whose fundamental physical and mathematical assumptions are no longer susceptible of any modification." In 1929, Heisenberg gave a series of invited lectures at the University of Chicago explaining the new field of quantum mechanics. The lectures then served as the basis for his textbook, The Physical Principles of the Quantum Theory, published in 1930. In the book's preface, Heisenberg wrote:

On the whole, the book contains nothing that is not to be found in previous publications, particularly in the investigations of Bohr. The purpose of the book seems to me to be fulfilled if it contributes somewhat to the diffusion of that 'Kopenhagener Geist der Quantentheorie' [Copenhagen spirit of quantum theory] if I may so express myself, which has directed the entire development of modern atomic physics.

The term 'Copenhagen interpretation' suggests something more than just a spirit, such as some definite set of rules for interpreting the mathematical formalism of quantum mechanics, presumably dating back to the 1920s. However, no such text exists, and the writings of Bohr and Heisenberg contradict each other on several important issues. It appears that the particular term, with its more definite sense, was coined by Heisenberg around 1955, while criticizing alternative "interpretations" (e.g., David Bohm's) that had been developed. Lectures with the titles 'The Copenhagen Interpretation of Quantum Theory' and 'Criticisms and Counterproposals to the Copenhagen Interpretation', that Heisenberg delivered in 1955, are reprinted in the collection Physics and Philosophy. Before the book was released for sale, Heisenberg privately expressed regret for having used the term, due to its suggestion of the existence of other interpretations, that he considered to be "nonsense". In a 1960 review of Heisenberg's book, Bohr's close collaborator Léon Rosenfeld called the term an "ambiguous expression" and suggested it be discarded. However, this did not come to pass, and the term entered widespread use. Bohr's ideas in particular are distinct despite the use of his Copenhagen home in the name of the interpretation.

== Principles ==
There is no uniquely definitive statement of the Copenhagen interpretation. The term encompasses the views developed by a number of scientists and philosophers during the second quarter of the 20th century. This lack of a single, authoritative source that establishes the Copenhagen interpretation is one difficulty with discussing it; another complication is that the philosophical background familiar to Einstein, Bohr, Heisenberg, and contemporaries is much less so to physicists and even philosophers of physics in more recent times. Bohr and Heisenberg never totally agreed on how to understand the mathematical formalism of quantum mechanics, and Bohr distanced himself from what he considered Heisenberg's more subjective interpretation. Bohr offered an interpretation that is independent of a subjective observer, or measurement, or collapse; instead, an "irreversible" or effectively irreversible process causes the decay of quantum coherence which imparts the classical behavior of "observation" or "measurement".

Different commentators and researchers have associated various ideas with the term. Asher Peres remarked that very different, sometimes opposite, views are presented as "the Copenhagen interpretation" by different authors. (Note: "There seems to be at least as many different Copenhagen interpretations as people who use that term, probably there are more. For example, in two classic articles on the foundations of quantum mechanics, Ballentine (1970) and Stapp (1972) give diametrically opposite definitions of 'Copenhagen.'") N. David Mermin coined the phrase "Shut up and calculate!" to summarize Copenhagen-type views, a saying often misattributed to Richard Feynman and which Mermin later found insufficiently nuanced. Mermin described the Copenhagen interpretation as coming in different "versions", "varieties", or "flavors".

Some basic principles generally accepted as part of the interpretation include the following:

1. Quantum mechanics is intrinsically indeterministic.
2. The correspondence principle: in the appropriate limit, quantum theory comes to resemble classical physics and reproduces the classical predictions.
3. The Born rule: the wave function of a system yields probabilities for the outcomes of measurements upon that system.
4. Complementarity: certain properties cannot be jointly defined for the same system at the same time. In order to talk about a specific property of a system, that system must be considered within the context of a specific laboratory arrangement. Observable quantities corresponding to mutually exclusive laboratory arrangements cannot be predicted together, but the consideration of multiple such mutually exclusive experiments is necessary to characterize a system.

Hans Primas and Roland Omnès give a more detailed breakdown that, in addition to the above, includes the following:

1. Quantum physics applies to individual objects. The probabilities computed by the Born rule do not require an ensemble or collection of "identically prepared" systems to understand.
2. The results provided by measuring devices are essentially classical, and should be described in ordinary language. This was particularly emphasized by Bohr, and was accepted by Heisenberg. (Note: Bohr declared, "In the first place, we must recognize that a measurement can mean nothing else than the unambiguous comparison of some property of the object under investigation with a corresponding property of another system, serving as a measuring instrument, and for which this property is directly determinable according to its definition in everyday language or in the terminology of classical physics." Heisenberg wrote, "Every description of phenomena, of experiments and their results, rests upon language as the only means of communication. The words of this language represent the concepts of ordinary life, which in the scientific language of physics may be refined to the concepts of classical physics. These concepts are the only tools for an unambiguous communication about events, about the setting up of experiments and about their results.")
3. Per the above point, the device used to observe a system must be described in classical language, while the system under observation is treated in quantum terms. This is a particularly subtle issue for which Bohr and Heisenberg came to differing conclusions. According to Heisenberg, the boundary between classical and quantum can be shifted in either direction at the observer's discretion. That is, the observer has the freedom to move what would become known as the "Heisenberg cut" without changing any physically meaningful predictions. On the other hand, Bohr argued both systems are quantum in principle, and the object-instrument distinction (the "cut") is dictated by the experimental arrangement. For Bohr, the "cut" was not a change in the dynamical laws that govern the systems in question, but a change in the language applied to them.
4. During an observation, the system must interact with a laboratory device. When that device makes a measurement, the wave function of the system collapses, irreversibly reducing to an eigenstate of the observable that is registered. The result of this process is a tangible record of the event, made by a potentiality becoming an actuality. (Note: Heisenberg wrote, "It is well known that the 'reduction of the wave packets' always appears in the Copenhagen interpretation when the transition is completed from the possible to the actual. The probability function, which covered a wide range of possibilities, is suddenly reduced to a much narrower range by the fact that the experiment has led to a definite result, that actually a certain event has happened. In the formalism this reduction requires that the so-called interference of probabilities, which is the most characteristic phenomena [sic] of quantum theory, is destroyed by the partly undefinable and irreversible interactions of the system with the measuring apparatus and the rest of the world." Bohr suggested that "irreversibility" was "characteristic of the very concept of observation", an idea that Weizsäcker would later elaborate upon, trying to formulate a rigorous mathematical notion of irreversibility using thermodynamics, and thus show that irreversibility results in the classical approximation of the world. See also Stenholm.)
5. Statements about measurements that are not actually made do not have meaning. For example, there is no meaning to the statement that a photon traversed the upper path of a Mach–Zehnder interferometer unless the interferometer were actually built in such a way that the path taken by the photon is detected and registered.
6. Wave functions are objective, in that they do not depend upon personal opinions of individual physicists or other such arbitrary influences.

There are some fundamental agreements and disagreements between the views of Bohr and Heisenberg. For example, Heisenberg emphasized a sharp "cut" between the observer (or the instrument) and the system being observed, while Bohr offered an interpretation that is independent of a subjective observer or measurement or collapse, which relies on an "irreversible" or effectively irreversible process, which could take place within the quantum system.

Another issue of importance where Bohr and Heisenberg disagreed is wave–particle duality. Bohr maintained that the distinction between a wave view and a particle view was defined by a distinction between experimental setups, whereas Heisenberg held that it was defined by the possibility of viewing the mathematical formulas as referring to waves or particles. Bohr thought that a particular experimental setup would display either a wave picture or a particle picture, but not both. Heisenberg thought that every mathematical formulation was capable of both wave and particle interpretations.

== Nature of the wave function ==
A wave function is a mathematical entity that describes the shape of a wave form. In the Copenhagen interpretation this wave form provides a probability distribution for the outcomes of each possible measurement on a system. Knowledge of the wave function together with the rules for the system's evolution in time exhausts all that can be predicted about the system's behavior. Generally, Copenhagen-type interpretations deny that the wave function provides a directly apprehensible image of an ordinary material body or a discernible component of some such, or anything more than a theoretical concept.

=== Probabilities via the Born rule ===
The Born rule is essential to the Copenhagen interpretation. Formulated by Max Born in 1926, it gives the probability that a measurement of a quantum system will yield a given result. In its simplest form, it states that the probability density of finding a particle at a given point, when measured, is proportional to the square of the magnitude of the particle's wave function at that point. (Note: While Born himself described his contribution as the "statistical interpretation" of the wave function, the term "statistical interpretation" has also been used as a synonym for the ensemble interpretation.)

=== Collapse ===
The concept of wave function collapse postulates that the wave function of a system can change suddenly and discontinuously upon measurement. Prior to a measurement, a wave function involves the various probabilities for the different potential outcomes of that measurement. But when the apparatus registers one of those outcomes, no traces of the others linger. Since Bohr did not view the wavefunction as something physical, he never talks about "collapse". Nevertheless, many physicists and philosophers associate collapse with the Copenhagen interpretation.

Heisenberg spoke of the wave function as representing available knowledge of a system, and did not use the term "collapse", but instead termed it "reduction" of the wave function to a new state representing the change in available knowledge which occurs once a particular phenomenon is registered by the apparatus.

=== Role of the observer ===
Because they assert that the existence of an observed value depends upon the intercession of the observer, Copenhagen-type interpretations are sometimes called "subjective". All of the original Copenhagen protagonists considered the process of observation as mechanical and independent of the individuality of the observer. Wolfgang Pauli, for example, insisted that measurement results could be obtained and recorded by "objective registering apparatus". As Heisenberg wrote,

Of course the introduction of the observer must not be misunderstood to imply that some kind of subjective features are to be brought into the description of nature. The observer has, rather, only the function of registering decisions, i.e., processes in space and time, and it does not matter whether the observer is an apparatus or a human being; but the registration, i.e., the transition from the "possible" to the "actual," is absolutely necessary here and cannot be omitted from the interpretation of quantum theory.

In the 1970s and 1980s, the theory of decoherence helped to explain the appearance of quasi-classical realities emerging from quantum theory, but was insufficient to provide a technical explanation for the apparent wave function collapse.

=== Completion by hidden variables? ===
In metaphysical terms, the Copenhagen interpretation views quantum mechanics as providing knowledge of phenomena, but not as pointing to 'really existing objects', which it regards as residues of ordinary intuition. This makes it an epistemic theory. This may be contrasted with Einstein's view, that physics should look for 'really existing objects', making itself an ontic theory.

The metaphysical question is sometimes asked: "Could quantum mechanics be extended by adding so-called "hidden variables" to the mathematical formalism, to convert it from an epistemic to an ontic theory?" The Copenhagen interpretation answers this with a strong 'No'. It is sometimes alleged, for example by J.S. Bell, that Einstein opposed the Copenhagen interpretation because he believed that the answer to that question of "hidden variables" was "yes". By contrast, Max Jammer writes "Einstein never proposed a hidden variable theory." Einstein explored the possibility of a hidden variable theory, and wrote a paper describing his exploration, but withdrew it from publication because he felt it was faulty.

== Acceptance among physicists ==
During the 1930s and 1940s, views about quantum mechanics attributed to Bohr and emphasizing complementarity became commonplace among physicists. Textbooks of the time generally maintained the principle that the numerical value of a physical quantity is not meaningful or does not exist until it is measured. Prominent physicists associated with Copenhagen-type interpretations have included Lev Landau, Wolfgang Pauli, Rudolf Peierls, Asher Peres, Léon Rosenfeld, and Ray Streater.

Throughout much of the 20th century, the Copenhagen tradition had overwhelming acceptance among physicists. According to a very informal poll (some people voted for multiple interpretations) conducted at a quantum mechanics conference in 1997, the Copenhagen interpretation remained the most widely accepted label that physicists applied to their own views. A similar result was found in polls conducted in 2011 and 2025.

== Consequences ==
The nature of the Copenhagen interpretation is exposed by considering a number of experiments and paradoxes.

=== Schrödinger's cat ===
This thought experiment highlights the implications that accepting uncertainty at the microscopic level has on macroscopic objects. A cat is put in a sealed box, with its life or death made dependent on the state of a subatomic particle. Thus a description of the cat during the course of the experiment—having been entangled with the state of a subatomic particle—becomes a "blur" of "living and dead cat." But this cannot be accurate because it implies the cat is actually both dead and alive until the box is opened to check on it. But the cat, if it survives, will only remember being alive. Schrödinger resists "so naively accepting as valid a 'blurred model' for representing reality." How can the cat be both alive and dead?

In Copenhagen-type views, the wave function reflects our knowledge of the system. The wave function $(|\text{dead}\rangle + |\text{alive}\rangle)/\sqrt 2$ means that, once the cat is observed, there is a 50% chance it will be dead, and 50% chance it will be alive. (Some versions of the Copenhagen interpretation reject the idea that a wave function can be assigned to a physical system that meets the everyday definition of "cat"; in this view, the correct quantum-mechanical description of the cat-and-particle system must include a superselection rule.)

=== Wigner's friend ===
"Wigner's friend" is a thought experiment intended to make that of Schrödinger's cat more striking by involving two conscious beings, traditionally known as Wigner and his friend. (In more recent literature, they may also be known as Alice and Bob, as per the convention of describing protocols in information theory.) Wigner puts his friend in with the cat. The external observer believes the system is in state $(|\text{dead}\rangle + |\text{alive}\rangle)/\sqrt 2$. However, his friend is convinced that the cat is alive, i.e. for him, the cat is in the state $|\text{alive}\rangle$. How can Wigner and his friend see different wave functions?

In a Heisenbergian view, the answer depends on the positioning of Heisenberg cut, which can be placed arbitrarily (at least according to Heisenberg, though not to Bohr.) If Wigner's friend is positioned on the same side of the cut as the external observer, his measurements collapse the wave function for both observers. If he is positioned on the cat's side, his interaction with the cat is not considered a measurement. Different Copenhagen-type interpretations take different positions as to whether observers can be placed on the quantum side of the cut.

=== Double-slit experiment ===
In the basic version of this experiment, a light source, such as a laser beam, illuminates a plate pierced by two parallel slits, and the light passing through the slits is observed on a screen behind the plate. The wave nature of light causes the light waves passing through the two slits to interfere, producing bright and dark bands on the screen – a result that would not be expected if light consisted of classical particles. However, the light is always found to be absorbed at the screen at discrete points, as individual particles (not waves); the interference pattern appears via the varying density of these particle hits on the screen. Furthermore, versions of the experiment that include detectors at the slits find that each detected photon passes through one slit (as would a classical particle), and not through both slits (as would a wave). Such experiments demonstrate that particles do not form the interference pattern if one detects which slit they pass through.

According to Bohr's complementarity principle, light is neither a wave nor a stream of particles. A particular experiment can demonstrate particle behavior (passing through a definite slit) or wave behavior (interference), but not both at the same time.

The same experiment has been performed for light, electrons, atoms, and molecules. The extremely small de Broglie wavelength of objects with larger mass makes experiments increasingly difficult, but in general quantum mechanics considers all matter as possessing both particle and wave behaviors.

=== Einstein–Podolsky–Rosen paradox ===
This thought experiment involves a pair of particles prepared in what later authors would refer to as an entangled state. In a 1935 paper, Einstein, Boris Podolsky, and Nathan Rosen pointed out that, in this state, if the position of the first particle were measured, the result of measuring the position of the second particle could be predicted. If instead the momentum of the first particle were measured, then the result of measuring the momentum of the second particle could be predicted. They argued that no action taken on the first particle could instantaneously affect the other, since this would involve information being transmitted faster than light, which is forbidden by the theory of relativity. They invoked a principle, later known as the "Einstein–Podolsky–Rosen (EPR) criterion of reality", positing that, "If, without in any way disturbing a system, we can predict with certainty (i.e., with probability equal to unity) the value of a physical quantity, then there exists an element of reality corresponding to that quantity". From this, they inferred that the second particle must have a definite value of position and of momentum prior to either being measured.

Bohr's response to the EPR paper was published in the Physical Review later that same year. He argued that EPR had reasoned fallaciously. Because measurements of position and of momentum are complementary, making the choice to measure one excludes the possibility of measuring the other. Consequently, a fact deduced regarding one arrangement of laboratory apparatus could not be combined with a fact deduced by means of the other, and so, the inference of predetermined position and momentum values for the second particle was not valid. Bohr concluded that EPR's "arguments do not justify their conclusion that the quantum description turns out to be essentially incomplete."

== Criticism ==
=== Incompleteness and indeterminism ===
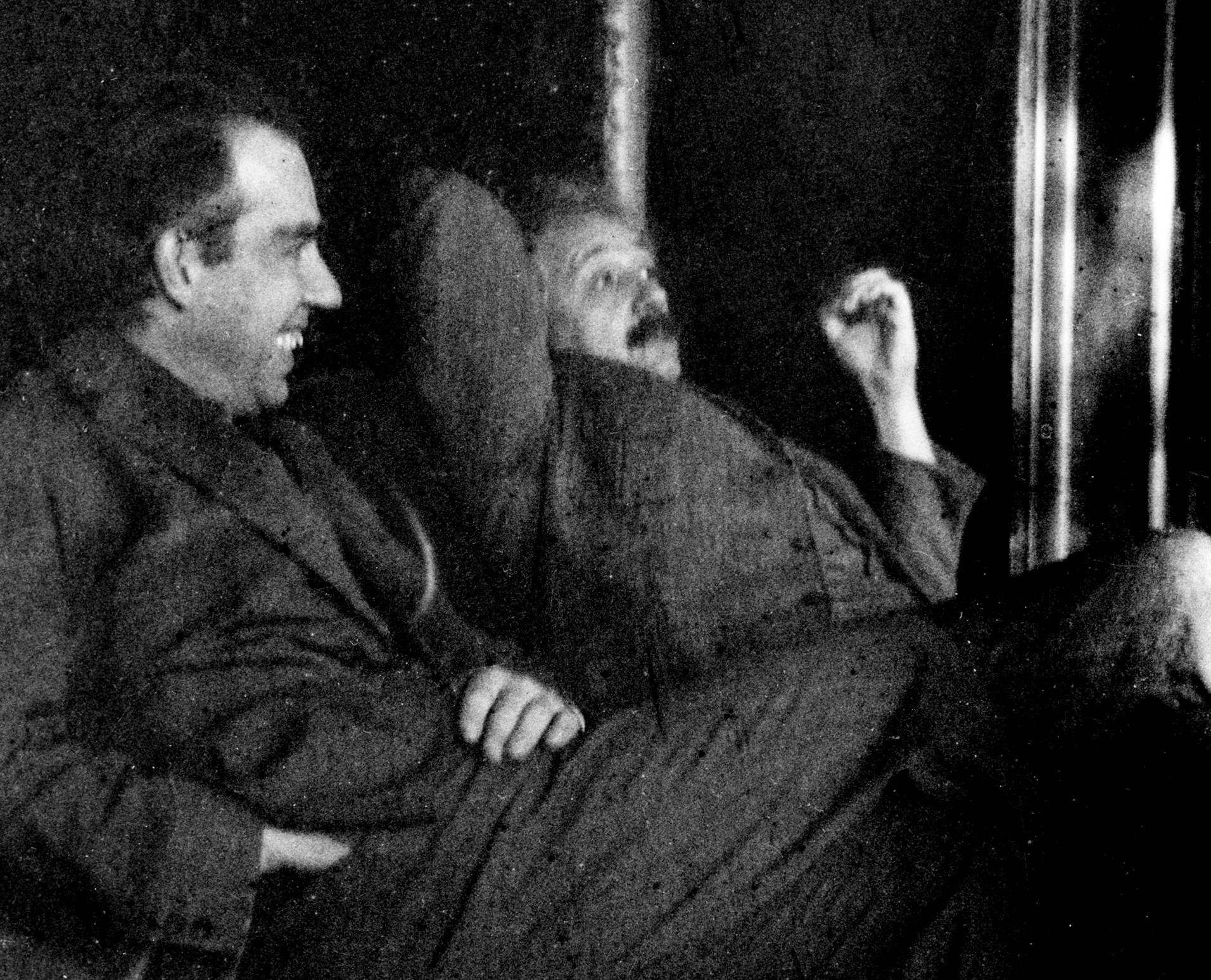
Niels Bohr and Albert Einstein, pictured here at Paul Ehrenfest's home in Leiden (December 1925), had a long-running collegial dispute about what quantum mechanics implied for the nature of reality.

Einstein was an early and persistent supporter of objective reality. Bohr and Heisenberg advanced the position that no physical property could be understood without an act of measurement, while Einstein refused to accept this. Abraham Pais recalled a walk with Einstein when the two discussed quantum mechanics: "Einstein suddenly stopped, turned to me and asked whether I really believed that the moon exists only when I look at it." While Einstein did not doubt that quantum mechanics was a correct physical theory in that it gave correct predictions, he maintained that it could not be a complete theory. The most famous product of his efforts to argue the incompleteness of quantum theory is the Einstein–Podolsky–Rosen thought experiment, which was intended to show that physical properties like position and momentum have values even if not measured. (Note: The published form of the EPR argument was due to Podolsky, and Einstein himself was not satisfied with it. In his own publications and correspondence, Einstein used a different argument to insist that quantum mechanics is an incomplete theory.) The argument of EPR was not generally persuasive to other physicists.

Carl Friedrich von Weizsäcker, while participating in a colloquium at Cambridge, denied that the Copenhagen interpretation asserted "What cannot be observed does not exist". Instead, he suggested that the Copenhagen interpretation follows the principle "What is observed certainly exists; about what is not observed we are still free to make suitable assumptions. We use that freedom to avoid paradoxes."

Einstein was likewise dissatisfied with the indeterminism of quantum theory. Regarding the possibility of randomness in nature, Einstein said that he was "convinced that He [God] does not throw dice." Bohr, in response, reputedly said that "it cannot be for us to tell God, how he is to run the world". (Note: Bohr recollected his reply to Einstein at the 1927 Solvay Congress in his essay "Discussion with Einstein on Epistemological Problems in Atomic Physics", in Albert Einstein, Philosopher–Scientist, ed. Paul Arthur Shilpp, Harper, 1949, p. 211: "...in spite of all divergencies of approach and opinion, a most humorous spirit animated the discussions. On his side, Einstein mockingly asked us whether we could really believe that the providential authorities took recourse to dice-playing ("ob der liebe Gott würfelt"), to which I replied by pointing at the great caution, already called for by ancient thinkers, in ascribing attributes to Providence in everyday language." Werner Heisenberg, who also attended the congress, recalled the exchange in Encounters with Einstein, Princeton University Press, 1983, p. 117: "But he [Einstein] still stood by his watchword, which he clothed in the words: 'God does not play at dice.' To which Bohr could only answer: 'But still, it cannot be for us to tell God, how he is to run the world.'")

=== The Heisenberg cut ===
Much criticism of Copenhagen-type interpretations has focused on the need for a classical domain where observers or measuring devices can reside, and the imprecision of how the boundary between quantum and classical might be defined. This boundary came to be termed the Heisenberg cut (while John Bell derisively called it the "shifty split".). As typically portrayed, Copenhagen-type interpretations involve two different kinds of time evolution for wave functions, the deterministic flow according to the Schrödinger equation and the probabilistic jump during measurement, without a clear criterion for when each kind applies. Why should these two different processes exist, when physicists and laboratory equipment are made of the same matter as the rest of the universe? And if there is somehow a split, where should it be placed? Steven Weinberg writes that the traditional presentation gives "no way to locate the boundary between the realms in which [...] quantum mechanics does or does not apply."

The problem of thinking in terms of classical measurements of a quantum system becomes particularly acute in the field of quantum cosmology, where the quantum system is the universe. How does an observer stand outside the universe in order to measure it, and who was there to observe the universe in its earliest stages? Advocates of Copenhagen-type interpretations have disputed the seriousness of these objections. Rudolf Peierls noted that "the observer does not have to be contemporaneous with the event"; for example, we study the early universe through the cosmic microwave background, and we can apply quantum mechanics to that just as well as to any electromagnetic field. Likewise, Asher Peres argued that physicists are, conceptually, outside those degrees of freedom that cosmology studies, and applying quantum mechanics to the radius of the universe while neglecting the physicists in it is no different from quantizing the electric current in a superconductor while neglecting the atomic-level details.

You may object that there is only one universe, but likewise there is only one SQUID in my laboratory.

== Alternatives ==
A large number of alternative interpretations have appeared, sharing some aspects of the Copenhagen interpretation while providing alternatives to other aspects. The ensemble interpretation is similar; it offers an interpretation of the wave function, but not for single particles. The consistent histories interpretation advertises itself as "Copenhagen done right". More recently, interpretations inspired by quantum information theory like QBism and relational quantum mechanics have appeared. Experts on quantum foundational issues continue to favor the Copenhagen interpretation over other alternatives. Physicists who have suggested that the Copenhagen tradition needs to be built upon or extended include Rudolf Haag and Anton Zeilinger.

Under realism and determinism, if the wave function is regarded as ontologically real, and collapse is entirely rejected, a many-worlds interpretation results. If wave function collapse is regarded as ontologically real as well, an objective collapse theory is obtained. Bohmian mechanics shows that it is possible to reformulate quantum mechanics to make it deterministic, at the price of making it explicitly nonlocal. It attributes not only a wave function to a physical system, but in addition a real position, that evolves deterministically under a nonlocal guiding equation. The evolution of a physical system is given at all times by the Schrödinger equation together with the guiding equation; there is never a collapse of the wave function. The transactional interpretation is also explicitly nonlocal.

Some physicists espoused views in the "Copenhagen spirit" and then went on to advocate other interpretations. For example, David Bohm and Alfred Landé both wrote textbooks that put forth ideas in the Bohr–Heisenberg tradition, and later promoted nonlocal hidden variables and an ensemble interpretation respectively. John Archibald Wheeler began his career as an "apostle of Niels Bohr"; he then supervised the PhD thesis of Hugh Everett that proposed the many-worlds interpretation. After supporting Everett's work for several years, he began to distance himself from the many-worlds interpretation in the 1970s. Late in life, he wrote that while the Copenhagen interpretation might fairly be called "the fog from the north", it "remains the best interpretation of the quantum that we have".

Other physicists, while influenced by the Copenhagen tradition, have expressed frustration at how it took the mathematical formalism of quantum theory as given, rather than trying to understand how it might arise from something more fundamental. (E. T. Jaynes described the mathematical formalism of quantum physics as "a peculiar mixture describing in part realities of Nature, in part incomplete human information about Nature—all scrambled up together by Heisenberg and Bohr into an omelette that nobody has seen how to unscramble.") This dissatisfaction has motivated new interpretative variants as well as technical work in quantum foundations.

== See also ==
- Bohr–Einstein debates
- Einstein's thought experiments
- Fifth Solvay Conference
- Philosophical interpretation of classical physics
- Physical ontology
- Popper's experiment
- Consciousness causes collapse
