= Relationalism =

Theory on the importance of relations

Relationalism is any theoretical position that gives importance to the relational nature of things. For relationalism, things exist and function only as relational entities.

== Relationalism (philosophical theory) ==
Relationalism, in the broadest sense, applies to any system of thought that gives importance to the relational nature of reality. In its narrower and more philosophically restricted sense, as propounded by the Indian philosopher Joseph Kaipayil and others, relationalism refers to the theory of reality that interprets the existence, nature, and meaning of things in terms of their relationality or relatedness. In the relationalist view, things are neither self-standing entities nor vague events but relational particulars. Particulars are inherently relational, as they are ontologically open to other particulars in their constitution and action. Relational particulars, in the relationalist view, are the ultimate constituents of reality.

== Relationalism (theory of space and time) ==
In discussions about space and time, the name relationalism (or relationism) refers to Leibniz's relationist notion of space and time as against Newton's substantivalist views. According to Newton’s substantivalism, space and time are entities in their own right, existing independently of things. Leibniz's relationism, on the other hand, describes space and time as systems of relations that exist between objects.

More generally, in physics and philosophy, a relational theory is a framework to understand reality or a physical system in such a way that the positions and other properties of objects are only meaningful relative to other objects. In a relational spacetime theory, space does not exist unless there are objects in it; nor does time exist without events. The relational view proposes that space is contained in objects and that an object represents within itself relationships to other objects. Space can be defined through the relations among the objects that it contains considering their variations through time. This is an alternative to an absolute theory, in which the space exists independently of any objects that can be immersed in it.

The relational point of view was advocated in physics by Gottfried Wilhelm Leibniz and Ernst Mach (in his Mach's principle). It was rejected by Isaac Newton in his successful description of classical physics. Although Albert Einstein was impressed by Mach's principle, he did not fully incorporate it into his general theory of relativity. Several attempts have been made to formulate a full Machian theory, but most physicists think that none have so far succeeded. For example, see Brans–Dicke theory.

Relational quantum mechanics and a relational approach to quantum physics have been independently developed, in analogy with Einstein's special relativity of space and time. Relationist physicists such as John Baez and Carlo Rovelli have criticised the leading unified theory of gravity and quantum mechanics, string theory, for retaining absolute space. Some prefer a developing theory of gravity, loop quantum gravity, for its 'backgroundlessness'.

== Relationalism (colour theory) ==
Relationalism in colour theory, as defended by Jonathan Cohen and others, means the view that colours of an object are constituted partly in terms of relations with the perceiver. An anti-relationalist view about colour, on the other hand, would insist colours are object-dependent.

== Relationalism (sociological theory) ==
In relational sociology, relationalism is often contrasted with substantivalism. While substantivalism (also called substantialism) tends to view individuals as self-subsistent entities capable of social interaction, relationalism underscores the social human practices and the individual's transactional contexts and reciprocal relations. Georg Simmel was methodologically a relationalist, because he was more interested in the interactions among individuals than the substantial qualities of the individual.

== See also ==
- Indigenous law
- Kinship
