= List of minor planets: 884001–885000 =

The following is a partial list of minor planets, running from minor-planet number 884001 through 885000, inclusive. The primary data for this and other partial lists is based on JPL's "Small-Body Orbital Elements" and data available from the Minor Planet Center. Critical list information is also provided by the MPC, unless otherwise specified from Lowell Observatory. A detailed description of the table's columns and additional sources are given on the main page including a complete list of every page in this series, and a statistical break-up on the dynamical classification of minor planets.

Also see the summary list of all named bodies in numerical and alphabetical order, and the corresponding naming citations for the number range of this particular list. New namings may only be added to this list after official publication, as the preannouncement of names is condemned by the Working Group for Small Bodies Nomenclature of the International Astronomical Union.

| Near-Earth obj. | MBA (inner) | MBA (outer) | Centaur |
| Mars-crosser | MBA (middle) | Jupiter trojan | Trans-Neptunian obj. |
| Unclassified |

== 884001–884100 ==
| Designation | | | Discovery | | | Properties | | Ref |
| Permanent | Provisional | Named after | Date | Site | Discoverer(s) | Category | Diam. | Ref |
|---|---|---|---|---|---|---|---|---|
| 884001 | 2016 XO_{1} | — | July 17, 2016 | Haleakala | Pan-STARRS 1 | · | 1.8 km | MPC · JPL |
| 884002 | 2016 XZ_{6} | — | February 8, 2008 | Mount Lemmon | Mount Lemmon Survey | · | 1.9 km | MPC · JPL |
| 884003 | 2016 XE_{7} | — | October 25, 2003 | Kitt Peak | Spacewatch | · | 1 km | MPC · JPL |
| 884004 | 2016 XN_{8} | — | June 27, 2015 | Haleakala | Pan-STARRS 1 | EUN | 820 m | MPC · JPL |
| 884005 | 2016 XX_{8} | — | October 28, 2016 | Haleakala | Pan-STARRS 1 | DOR | 1.6 km | MPC · JPL |
| 884006 | 2016 XS_{11} | — | December 4, 2016 | Mount Lemmon | Mount Lemmon Survey | · | 1.6 km | MPC · JPL |
| 884007 | 2016 XJ_{14} | — | November 19, 2016 | Mount Lemmon | Mount Lemmon Survey | · | 1.0 km | MPC · JPL |
| 884008 | 2016 XM_{16} | — | November 10, 2016 | Mount Lemmon | Mount Lemmon Survey | · | 810 m | MPC · JPL |
| 884009 | 2016 XN_{20} | — | November 10, 2016 | Haleakala | Pan-STARRS 1 | · | 1.2 km | MPC · JPL |
| 884010 | 2016 XB_{23} | — | September 20, 2011 | Haleakala | Pan-STARRS 1 | · | 1.1 km | MPC · JPL |
| 884011 | 2016 XA_{24} | — | December 9, 2016 | Mount Lemmon | Mount Lemmon Survey | APO | 440 m | MPC · JPL |
| 884012 | 2016 XD_{27} | — | December 1, 2016 | Mount Lemmon | Mount Lemmon Survey | · | 1.4 km | MPC · JPL |
| 884013 | 2016 XT_{27} | — | November 11, 2016 | Mount Lemmon | Mount Lemmon Survey | · | 970 m | MPC · JPL |
| 884014 | 2016 XU_{27} | — | December 5, 2016 | Mount Lemmon | Mount Lemmon Survey | · | 1.3 km | MPC · JPL |
| 884015 | 2016 XC_{28} | — | December 9, 2016 | Mount Lemmon | Mount Lemmon Survey | H | 330 m | MPC · JPL |
| 884016 | 2016 XE_{28} | — | December 8, 2016 | Mount Lemmon | Mount Lemmon Survey | · | 1.3 km | MPC · JPL |
| 884017 | 2016 XH_{28} | — | December 10, 2016 | Mount Lemmon | Mount Lemmon Survey | · | 1.3 km | MPC · JPL |
| 884018 | 2016 XV_{29} | — | December 1, 2016 | Mount Lemmon | Mount Lemmon Survey | · | 1.3 km | MPC · JPL |
| 884019 | 2016 XA_{30} | — | December 1, 2016 | Mount Lemmon | Mount Lemmon Survey | · | 980 m | MPC · JPL |
| 884020 | 2016 XR_{30} | — | December 1, 2016 | Mount Lemmon | Mount Lemmon Survey | · | 670 m | MPC · JPL |
| 884021 | 2016 XZ_{30} | — | December 9, 2016 | Mount Lemmon | Mount Lemmon Survey | · | 860 m | MPC · JPL |
| 884022 | 2016 XJ_{33} | — | December 8, 2016 | Mount Lemmon | Mount Lemmon Survey | · | 1.2 km | MPC · JPL |
| 884023 | 2016 XJ_{37} | — | December 4, 2016 | Mount Lemmon | Mount Lemmon Survey | · | 1.3 km | MPC · JPL |
| 884024 | 2016 YW | — | April 15, 2013 | Haleakala | Pan-STARRS 1 | · | 970 m | MPC · JPL |
| 884025 | 2016 YC_{1} | — | September 23, 2003 | Palomar | NEAT | · | 1.0 km | MPC · JPL |
| 884026 | 2016 YF_{3} | — | July 7, 2015 | Haleakala | Pan-STARRS 1 | · | 1.5 km | MPC · JPL |
| 884027 | 2016 YO_{5} | — | September 10, 2015 | Haleakala | Pan-STARRS 1 | TRE | 1.6 km | MPC · JPL |
| 884028 | 2016 YT_{5} | — | September 30, 2011 | Kitt Peak | Spacewatch | · | 1.3 km | MPC · JPL |
| 884029 | 2016 YG_{6} | — | November 21, 2009 | Catalina | CSS | · | 650 m | MPC · JPL |
| 884030 | 2016 YO_{6} | — | December 4, 2007 | Mount Lemmon | Mount Lemmon Survey | · | 1.5 km | MPC · JPL |
| 884031 | 2016 YW_{15} | — | December 23, 2016 | Haleakala | Pan-STARRS 1 | · | 2.1 km | MPC · JPL |
| 884032 | 2016 YE_{16} | — | December 23, 2016 | Haleakala | Pan-STARRS 1 | · | 1.4 km | MPC · JPL |
| 884033 | 2016 YP_{16} | — | December 23, 2016 | Haleakala | Pan-STARRS 1 | · | 1.6 km | MPC · JPL |
| 884034 | 2016 YB_{17} | — | December 27, 2016 | Mount Lemmon | Mount Lemmon Survey | · | 1.3 km | MPC · JPL |
| 884035 | 2016 YE_{17} | — | December 23, 2016 | Haleakala | Pan-STARRS 1 | · | 1.1 km | MPC · JPL |
| 884036 | 2016 YG_{18} | — | December 27, 2016 | Mount Lemmon | Mount Lemmon Survey | · | 1.2 km | MPC · JPL |
| 884037 | 2016 YD_{19} | — | December 27, 2016 | Mount Lemmon | Mount Lemmon Survey | JUN | 690 m | MPC · JPL |
| 884038 | 2016 YG_{19} | — | December 22, 2016 | Haleakala | Pan-STARRS 1 | EUN | 770 m | MPC · JPL |
| 884039 | 2016 YS_{19} | — | December 22, 2016 | Haleakala | Pan-STARRS 1 | · | 1.2 km | MPC · JPL |
| 884040 | 2016 YC_{20} | — | December 23, 2016 | Haleakala | Pan-STARRS 1 | · | 1.5 km | MPC · JPL |
| 884041 | 2016 YN_{21} | — | December 23, 2016 | Haleakala | Pan-STARRS 1 | · | 1.6 km | MPC · JPL |
| 884042 | 2016 YP_{21} | — | December 19, 2016 | Mount Lemmon | Mount Lemmon Survey | · | 1.4 km | MPC · JPL |
| 884043 | 2016 YB_{22} | — | December 24, 2016 | Mount Lemmon | Mount Lemmon Survey | · | 1.9 km | MPC · JPL |
| 884044 | 2016 YD_{22} | — | December 30, 2016 | XuYi | PMO NEO Survey Program | · | 1.3 km | MPC · JPL |
| 884045 | 2016 YJ_{22} | — | December 23, 2016 | Haleakala | Pan-STARRS 1 | · | 1.4 km | MPC · JPL |
| 884046 | 2016 YV_{23} | — | December 27, 2016 | Mount Lemmon | Mount Lemmon Survey | · | 1.5 km | MPC · JPL |
| 884047 | 2016 YE_{26} | — | December 23, 2016 | Haleakala | Pan-STARRS 1 | · | 910 m | MPC · JPL |
| 884048 | 2016 YP_{26} | — | December 23, 2016 | Haleakala | Pan-STARRS 1 | · | 650 m | MPC · JPL |
| 884049 | 2016 YW_{34} | — | December 23, 2016 | Haleakala | Pan-STARRS 1 | · | 1.4 km | MPC · JPL |
| 884050 | 2016 YX_{34} | — | December 24, 2016 | Mount Lemmon | Mount Lemmon Survey | · | 560 m | MPC · JPL |
| 884051 | 2016 YH_{38} | — | December 23, 2016 | Haleakala | Pan-STARRS 1 | L5 | 7.5 km | MPC · JPL |
| 884052 | 2016 YM_{41} | — | December 25, 2016 | Subaru Telescope, | Subaru Telescope | · | 1.3 km | MPC · JPL |
| 884053 | 2017 AZ | — | October 2, 2011 | Piszkéstető | K. Sárneczky | · | 1.3 km | MPC · JPL |
| 884054 | 2017 AQ_{1} | — | January 2, 2017 | Haleakala | Pan-STARRS 1 | EUN | 810 m | MPC · JPL |
| 884055 | 2017 AT_{1} | — | January 2, 2017 | Haleakala | Pan-STARRS 1 | · | 1.3 km | MPC · JPL |
| 884056 | 2017 AD_{2} | — | December 23, 2016 | Haleakala | Pan-STARRS 1 | (1547) | 980 m | MPC · JPL |
| 884057 | 2017 AS_{3} | — | March 8, 2013 | Haleakala | Pan-STARRS 1 | · | 1.4 km | MPC · JPL |
| 884058 | 2017 AS_{7} | — | November 10, 2016 | Haleakala | Pan-STARRS 1 | · | 960 m | MPC · JPL |
| 884059 | 2017 AP_{8} | — | January 14, 2013 | Catalina | CSS | · | 980 m | MPC · JPL |
| 884060 | 2017 AO_{9} | — | September 28, 2011 | Catalina | CSS | · | 1.7 km | MPC · JPL |
| 884061 | 2017 AW_{15} | — | December 27, 2016 | Mount Lemmon | Mount Lemmon Survey | · | 1.2 km | MPC · JPL |
| 884062 | 2017 AB_{16} | — | June 27, 2015 | Haleakala | Pan-STARRS 1 | · | 1.6 km | MPC · JPL |
| 884063 | 2017 AB_{23} | — | February 3, 2012 | Haleakala | Pan-STARRS 1 | BRA | 980 m | MPC · JPL |
| 884064 | 2017 AY_{25} | — | January 4, 2017 | Haleakala | Pan-STARRS 1 | JUN | 600 m | MPC · JPL |
| 884065 | 2017 AM_{26} | — | January 8, 2017 | Mount Lemmon | Mount Lemmon Survey | · | 870 m | MPC · JPL |
| 884066 | 2017 AE_{27} | — | January 3, 2017 | Haleakala | Pan-STARRS 1 | · | 1.5 km | MPC · JPL |
| 884067 | 2017 AK_{27} | — | January 3, 2017 | Haleakala | Pan-STARRS 1 | · | 1.3 km | MPC · JPL |
| 884068 | 2017 AG_{28} | — | January 9, 2017 | Mount Lemmon | Mount Lemmon Survey | · | 1.5 km | MPC · JPL |
| 884069 | 2017 AJ_{28} | — | January 4, 2017 | Haleakala | Pan-STARRS 1 | URS | 2.1 km | MPC · JPL |
| 884070 | 2017 AA_{34} | — | January 4, 2017 | Haleakala | Pan-STARRS 1 | · | 1.9 km | MPC · JPL |
| 884071 | 2017 AQ_{34} | — | January 2, 2017 | Haleakala | Pan-STARRS 1 | · | 1 km | MPC · JPL |
| 884072 | 2017 AR_{34} | — | January 4, 2017 | Haleakala | Pan-STARRS 1 | · | 1.3 km | MPC · JPL |
| 884073 | 2017 AL_{35} | — | January 2, 2017 | Haleakala | Pan-STARRS 1 | H | 340 m | MPC · JPL |
| 884074 | 2017 AJ_{36} | — | January 7, 2017 | Mount Lemmon | Mount Lemmon Survey | · | 850 m | MPC · JPL |
| 884075 | 2017 AS_{36} | — | January 4, 2017 | Haleakala | Pan-STARRS 1 | · | 1.2 km | MPC · JPL |
| 884076 | 2017 AD_{37} | — | January 5, 2017 | Mount Lemmon | Mount Lemmon Survey | · | 1.8 km | MPC · JPL |
| 884077 | 2017 AO_{37} | — | January 2, 2017 | Haleakala | Pan-STARRS 1 | · | 1.4 km | MPC · JPL |
| 884078 | 2017 AP_{38} | — | January 9, 2017 | Mount Lemmon | Mount Lemmon Survey | · | 1.5 km | MPC · JPL |
| 884079 | 2017 AB_{39} | — | January 4, 2017 | Haleakala | Pan-STARRS 1 | · | 1.2 km | MPC · JPL |
| 884080 | 2017 AW_{39} | — | January 2, 2017 | Haleakala | Pan-STARRS 1 | · | 1.5 km | MPC · JPL |
| 884081 | 2017 AT_{40} | — | January 2, 2017 | Haleakala | Pan-STARRS 1 | · | 1.7 km | MPC · JPL |
| 884082 | 2017 AN_{46} | — | January 4, 2017 | Haleakala | Pan-STARRS 1 | · | 1.5 km | MPC · JPL |
| 884083 | 2017 AP_{53} | — | January 3, 2017 | Haleakala | Pan-STARRS 1 | · | 850 m | MPC · JPL |
| 884084 | 2017 AC_{54} | — | January 2, 2017 | Haleakala | Pan-STARRS 1 | EOS | 1.3 km | MPC · JPL |
| 884085 | 2017 AA_{56} | — | January 3, 2017 | Haleakala | Pan-STARRS 1 | · | 1.4 km | MPC · JPL |
| 884086 | 2017 AL_{57} | — | January 4, 2017 | Haleakala | Pan-STARRS 1 | · | 1.4 km | MPC · JPL |
| 884087 | 2017 AG_{60} | — | January 3, 2017 | Haleakala | Pan-STARRS 1 | L5 | 7.1 km | MPC · JPL |
| 884088 | 2017 AL_{60} | — | January 3, 2017 | Haleakala | Pan-STARRS 1 | L5 | 5.7 km | MPC · JPL |
| 884089 | 2017 AA_{67} | — | January 2, 2017 | Haleakala | Pan-STARRS 1 | · | 880 m | MPC · JPL |
| 884090 | 2017 BL_{3} | — | January 21, 2017 | XuYi | PMO NEO Survey Program | APO · PHA | 290 m | MPC · JPL |
| 884091 | 2017 BR_{3} | — | December 6, 2016 | Mount Lemmon | Mount Lemmon Survey | · | 1.9 km | MPC · JPL |
| 884092 | 2017 BB_{5} | — | January 21, 2017 | Bergisch Gladbach | W. Bickel | · | 1.5 km | MPC · JPL |
| 884093 | 2017 BN_{7} | — | November 28, 2016 | Haleakala | Pan-STARRS 1 | GAL | 1.6 km | MPC · JPL |
| 884094 | 2017 BQ_{9} | — | December 16, 2007 | Catalina | CSS | · | 1.5 km | MPC · JPL |
| 884095 | 2017 BH_{22} | — | January 26, 2017 | Haleakala | Pan-STARRS 1 | · | 1.9 km | MPC · JPL |
| 884096 | 2017 BR_{22} | — | September 22, 2008 | Kitt Peak | Spacewatch | V | 440 m | MPC · JPL |
| 884097 | 2017 BF_{27} | — | December 24, 2016 | Kitt Peak | Spacewatch | · | 1.1 km | MPC · JPL |
| 884098 | 2017 BT_{27} | — | August 21, 2015 | Haleakala | Pan-STARRS 1 | · | 1.6 km | MPC · JPL |
| 884099 | 2017 BP_{29} | — | January 27, 2017 | Haleakala | Pan-STARRS 1 | · | 1.3 km | MPC · JPL |
| 884100 | 2017 BR_{30} | — | December 24, 2016 | Mount Lemmon | Mount Lemmon Survey | · | 280 m | MPC · JPL |

== 884101–884200 ==
back to top

| Designation | | | Discovery | | | Properties | | Ref |
| Permanent | Provisional | Named after | Date | Site | Discoverer(s) | Category | Diam. | Ref |
|---|---|---|---|---|---|---|---|---|
| 884101 | 2017 BZ_{30} | — | January 28, 2017 | Catalina | CSS | · | 1.0 km | MPC · JPL |
| 884102 | 2017 BY_{33} | — | November 12, 2007 | Mount Lemmon | Mount Lemmon Survey | · | 1.2 km | MPC · JPL |
| 884103 | 2017 BJ_{39} | — | January 26, 2017 | Mount Lemmon | Mount Lemmon Survey | · | 1.5 km | MPC · JPL |
| 884104 | 2017 BV_{44} | — | February 26, 2008 | Kitt Peak | Spacewatch | AEO | 770 m | MPC · JPL |
| 884105 | 2017 BS_{45} | — | January 14, 2008 | Kitt Peak | Spacewatch | · | 1.3 km | MPC · JPL |
| 884106 | 2017 BO_{46} | — | December 27, 2011 | Mount Lemmon | Mount Lemmon Survey | · | 1.4 km | MPC · JPL |
| 884107 | 2017 BP_{53} | — | February 9, 2008 | Mount Lemmon | Mount Lemmon Survey | · | 1.3 km | MPC · JPL |
| 884108 | 2017 BR_{54} | — | January 19, 1996 | Kitt Peak | Spacewatch | · | 760 m | MPC · JPL |
| 884109 | 2017 BM_{60} | — | October 11, 2010 | Mount Lemmon | Mount Lemmon Survey | · | 1.6 km | MPC · JPL |
| 884110 | 2017 BN_{63} | — | January 9, 2017 | Mount Lemmon | Mount Lemmon Survey | (5) | 950 m | MPC · JPL |
| 884111 | 2017 BY_{63} | — | November 10, 2016 | Haleakala | Pan-STARRS 1 | · | 1.0 km | MPC · JPL |
| 884112 | 2017 BM_{66} | — | January 27, 2017 | Mount Lemmon | Mount Lemmon Survey | · | 2.3 km | MPC · JPL |
| 884113 | 2017 BD_{76} | — | September 4, 2011 | Haleakala | Pan-STARRS 1 | · | 850 m | MPC · JPL |
| 884114 | 2017 BU_{77} | — | July 28, 2014 | Haleakala | Pan-STARRS 1 | · | 1.4 km | MPC · JPL |
| 884115 | 2017 BP_{79} | — | January 27, 2017 | Haleakala | Pan-STARRS 1 | · | 840 m | MPC · JPL |
| 884116 | 2017 BA_{89} | — | October 26, 2011 | Haleakala | Pan-STARRS 1 | · | 1.2 km | MPC · JPL |
| 884117 | 2017 BM_{90} | — | October 23, 2011 | Haleakala | Pan-STARRS 1 | · | 1.1 km | MPC · JPL |
| 884118 | 2017 BL_{103} | — | January 2, 2012 | Mount Lemmon | Mount Lemmon Survey | · | 1.5 km | MPC · JPL |
| 884119 | 2017 BX_{103} | — | January 29, 2017 | Mount Lemmon | Mount Lemmon Survey | · | 1.7 km | MPC · JPL |
| 884120 | 2017 BP_{105} | — | January 21, 2012 | Kitt Peak | Spacewatch | · | 1.3 km | MPC · JPL |
| 884121 | 2017 BL_{109} | — | October 24, 2015 | Haleakala | Pan-STARRS 1 | GAL | 1.3 km | MPC · JPL |
| 884122 | 2017 BM_{122} | — | March 16, 2013 | Kitt Peak | Spacewatch | · | 1.2 km | MPC · JPL |
| 884123 | 2017 BE_{124} | — | December 23, 2016 | Haleakala | Pan-STARRS 1 | · | 1.2 km | MPC · JPL |
| 884124 | 2017 BG_{125} | — | December 1, 2011 | Haleakala | Pan-STARRS 1 | · | 1.2 km | MPC · JPL |
| 884125 | 2017 BT_{142} | — | January 30, 2017 | Haleakala | Pan-STARRS 1 | · | 1.5 km | MPC · JPL |
| 884126 | 2017 BP_{146} | — | January 26, 2017 | Haleakala | Pan-STARRS 1 | · | 1.5 km | MPC · JPL |
| 884127 | 2017 BT_{146} | — | January 29, 2017 | Mount Lemmon | Mount Lemmon Survey | · | 1.2 km | MPC · JPL |
| 884128 | 2017 BG_{147} | — | January 28, 2017 | Haleakala | Pan-STARRS 1 | · | 1.4 km | MPC · JPL |
| 884129 | 2017 BB_{148} | — | January 27, 2017 | Mount Lemmon | Mount Lemmon Survey | · | 1.6 km | MPC · JPL |
| 884130 | 2017 BJ_{148} | — | January 27, 2017 | Mount Lemmon | Mount Lemmon Survey | · | 1.2 km | MPC · JPL |
| 884131 | 2017 BH_{149} | — | January 29, 2017 | Haleakala | Pan-STARRS 1 | THB | 2.7 km | MPC · JPL |
| 884132 | 2017 BQ_{150} | — | January 31, 2017 | Mount Lemmon | Mount Lemmon Survey | L5 | 6.6 km | MPC · JPL |
| 884133 | 2017 BV_{151} | — | January 28, 2017 | Haleakala | Pan-STARRS 1 | · | 1.3 km | MPC · JPL |
| 884134 | 2017 BW_{152} | — | January 27, 2017 | Haleakala | Pan-STARRS 1 | · | 1.4 km | MPC · JPL |
| 884135 | 2017 BE_{153} | — | January 31, 2017 | Haleakala | Pan-STARRS 1 | · | 1.6 km | MPC · JPL |
| 884136 | 2017 BN_{158} | — | January 26, 2017 | Haleakala | Pan-STARRS 1 | · | 1.8 km | MPC · JPL |
| 884137 | 2017 BN_{163} | — | January 26, 2017 | Mount Lemmon | Mount Lemmon Survey | EOS | 1.3 km | MPC · JPL |
| 884138 | 2017 BL_{167} | — | January 26, 2017 | Mount Lemmon | Mount Lemmon Survey | · | 1.5 km | MPC · JPL |
| 884139 | 2017 BV_{167} | — | January 30, 2017 | Mount Lemmon | Mount Lemmon Survey | · | 1.1 km | MPC · JPL |
| 884140 | 2017 BL_{168} | — | January 29, 2017 | Haleakala | Pan-STARRS 1 | GEF | 760 m | MPC · JPL |
| 884141 | 2017 BO_{168} | — | January 28, 2017 | Mount Lemmon | Mount Lemmon Survey | · | 1.3 km | MPC · JPL |
| 884142 | 2017 BE_{169} | — | January 31, 2017 | Mount Lemmon | Mount Lemmon Survey | · | 1.5 km | MPC · JPL |
| 884143 | 2017 BC_{170} | — | January 27, 2017 | Mount Lemmon | Mount Lemmon Survey | · | 1.1 km | MPC · JPL |
| 884144 | 2017 BO_{170} | — | January 31, 2017 | Haleakala | Pan-STARRS 1 | · | 1.3 km | MPC · JPL |
| 884145 | 2017 BN_{172} | — | January 27, 2017 | Mount Lemmon | Mount Lemmon Survey | · | 1.2 km | MPC · JPL |
| 884146 | 2017 BC_{185} | — | November 8, 2015 | Mount Lemmon | Mount Lemmon Survey | · | 1.4 km | MPC · JPL |
| 884147 | 2017 BC_{186} | — | January 29, 2017 | Haleakala | Pan-STARRS 1 | · | 1.6 km | MPC · JPL |
| 884148 | 2017 BW_{189} | — | January 26, 2017 | Haleakala | Pan-STARRS 1 | · | 1.5 km | MPC · JPL |
| 884149 | 2017 BH_{190} | — | February 9, 2008 | Mount Lemmon | Mount Lemmon Survey | DOR | 1.7 km | MPC · JPL |
| 884150 | 2017 BB_{206} | — | January 27, 2017 | Haleakala | Pan-STARRS 1 | · | 1.1 km | MPC · JPL |
| 884151 | 2017 BD_{210} | — | January 27, 2017 | Haleakala | Pan-STARRS 1 | L5 | 6.4 km | MPC · JPL |
| 884152 | 2017 BH_{214} | — | January 27, 2017 | Haleakala | Pan-STARRS 1 | HYG | 1.9 km | MPC · JPL |
| 884153 | 2017 BV_{215} | — | January 28, 2017 | Mount Lemmon | Mount Lemmon Survey | · | 1.7 km | MPC · JPL |
| 884154 | 2017 BY_{216} | — | January 30, 2017 | Haleakala | Pan-STARRS 1 | · | 1.8 km | MPC · JPL |
| 884155 | 2017 BH_{219} | — | January 26, 2017 | Haleakala | Pan-STARRS 1 | L5 | 7.0 km | MPC · JPL |
| 884156 | 2017 BX_{220} | — | January 31, 2017 | Haleakala | Pan-STARRS 1 | L5 | 7.5 km | MPC · JPL |
| 884157 | 2017 BG_{221} | — | January 26, 2017 | Haleakala | Pan-STARRS 1 | L5 | 6.1 km | MPC · JPL |
| 884158 | 2017 BH_{229} | — | July 10, 2014 | Haleakala | Pan-STARRS 1 | · | 1.9 km | MPC · JPL |
| 884159 | 2017 BU_{237} | — | January 26, 2017 | Subaru Telescope, | Subaru Telescope | · | 1.6 km | MPC · JPL |
| 884160 | 2017 BP_{246} | — | January 23, 2017 | Subaru Telescope, | Subaru Telescope | · | 1.0 km | MPC · JPL |
| 884161 | 2017 BM_{247} | — | January 30, 2017 | Mount Lemmon | Mount Lemmon Survey | · | 1.7 km | MPC · JPL |
| 884162 | 2017 CX_{3} | — | December 23, 2016 | Haleakala | Pan-STARRS 1 | JUN | 700 m | MPC · JPL |
| 884163 | 2017 CD_{5} | — | February 1, 2017 | Mount Lemmon | Mount Lemmon Survey | · | 1.3 km | MPC · JPL |
| 884164 | 2017 CK_{6} | — | December 29, 2011 | Mount Lemmon | Mount Lemmon Survey | · | 1.2 km | MPC · JPL |
| 884165 | 2017 CO_{12} | — | January 28, 2017 | Haleakala | Pan-STARRS 1 | critical | 1.6 km | MPC · JPL |
| 884166 | 2017 CO_{14} | — | January 26, 2017 | Mount Lemmon | Mount Lemmon Survey | LIX | 2.2 km | MPC · JPL |
| 884167 | 2017 CA_{17} | — | September 9, 2015 | Haleakala | Pan-STARRS 1 | · | 1.1 km | MPC · JPL |
| 884168 | 2017 CU_{23} | — | February 28, 2014 | Haleakala | Pan-STARRS 1 | · | 460 m | MPC · JPL |
| 884169 | 2017 CK_{31} | — | January 16, 2008 | Mount Lemmon | Mount Lemmon Survey | · | 1.2 km | MPC · JPL |
| 884170 | 2017 CL_{36} | — | February 1, 2017 | Haleakala | Pan-STARRS 1 | H | 420 m | MPC · JPL |
| 884171 | 2017 CU_{36} | — | February 5, 2017 | Haleakala | Pan-STARRS 1 | · | 870 m | MPC · JPL |
| 884172 | 2017 CY_{38} | — | February 4, 2017 | Haleakala | Pan-STARRS 1 | · | 1.2 km | MPC · JPL |
| 884173 | 2017 CK_{40} | — | February 2, 2017 | Haleakala | Pan-STARRS 1 | H | 320 m | MPC · JPL |
| 884174 | 2017 CE_{41} | — | February 2, 2017 | Haleakala | Pan-STARRS 1 | · | 2.6 km | MPC · JPL |
| 884175 | 2017 CK_{41} | — | February 3, 2017 | Haleakala | Pan-STARRS 1 | · | 1.2 km | MPC · JPL |
| 884176 | 2017 CH_{52} | — | February 3, 2017 | Mount Lemmon | Mount Lemmon Survey | · | 1.3 km | MPC · JPL |
| 884177 | 2017 CB_{64} | — | February 1, 2017 | Subaru Telescope, | Subaru Telescope | · | 590 m | MPC · JPL |
| 884178 | 2017 CA_{65} | — | February 2, 2017 | Subaru Telescope, | Subaru Telescope | · | 1.1 km | MPC · JPL |
| 884179 | 2017 DO | — | November 22, 2006 | Mount Lemmon | Mount Lemmon Survey | · | 410 m | MPC · JPL |
| 884180 | 2017 DZ_{7} | — | September 11, 2015 | Haleakala | Pan-STARRS 1 | BRA | 1.0 km | MPC · JPL |
| 884181 | 2017 DK_{8} | — | January 31, 2017 | Haleakala | Pan-STARRS 1 | · | 1.8 km | MPC · JPL |
| 884182 | 2017 DC_{23} | — | January 27, 2017 | Haleakala | Pan-STARRS 1 | · | 1.3 km | MPC · JPL |
| 884183 | 2017 DK_{36} | — | October 8, 2012 | Haleakala | Pan-STARRS 1 | · | 800 m | MPC · JPL |
| 884184 | 2017 DG_{37} | — | January 7, 1999 | Kitt Peak | Spacewatch | H | 480 m | MPC · JPL |
| 884185 | 2017 DH_{37} | — | January 30, 2017 | Haleakala | Pan-STARRS 1 | H | 340 m | MPC · JPL |
| 884186 | 2017 DT_{37} | — | February 24, 2017 | Space Surveillance | Space Surveillance Telescope | AMO | 730 m | MPC · JPL |
| 884187 | 2017 DR_{39} | — | January 27, 2017 | Mount Lemmon | Mount Lemmon Survey | · | 840 m | MPC · JPL |
| 884188 | 2017 DA_{43} | — | September 4, 2011 | Haleakala | Pan-STARRS 1 | JUN | 590 m | MPC · JPL |
| 884189 | 2017 DR_{46} | — | May 4, 2014 | Mount Lemmon | Mount Lemmon Survey | · | 450 m | MPC · JPL |
| 884190 | 2017 DC_{47} | — | March 25, 2012 | Mount Lemmon | Mount Lemmon Survey | · | 1.4 km | MPC · JPL |
| 884191 | 2017 DC_{50} | — | February 21, 2017 | Mount Lemmon | Mount Lemmon Survey | · | 1.7 km | MPC · JPL |
| 884192 | 2017 DS_{54} | — | January 27, 2017 | Haleakala | Pan-STARRS 1 | · | 1.5 km | MPC · JPL |
| 884193 | 2017 DH_{59} | — | February 21, 2017 | Mount Lemmon | Mount Lemmon Survey | · | 1.7 km | MPC · JPL |
| 884194 | 2017 DQ_{61} | — | February 21, 2017 | Mount Lemmon | Mount Lemmon Survey | · | 1.6 km | MPC · JPL |
| 884195 | 2017 DY_{64} | — | January 26, 2017 | Haleakala | Pan-STARRS 1 | EOS | 1.2 km | MPC · JPL |
| 884196 | 2017 DZ_{67} | — | February 4, 2017 | Haleakala | Pan-STARRS 1 | THB | 2.1 km | MPC · JPL |
| 884197 | 2017 DA_{69} | — | January 27, 2017 | Haleakala | Pan-STARRS 1 | · | 520 m | MPC · JPL |
| 884198 | 2017 DR_{71} | — | March 1, 2000 | Catalina | CSS | PHO | 2.4 km | MPC · JPL |
| 884199 | 2017 DK_{77} | — | January 26, 2017 | Haleakala | Pan-STARRS 1 | H | 390 m | MPC · JPL |
| 884200 | 2017 DE_{88} | — | February 22, 2017 | Mount Lemmon | Mount Lemmon Survey | · | 1.7 km | MPC · JPL |

== 884201–884300 ==
back to top

| Designation | | | Discovery | | | Properties | | Ref |
| Permanent | Provisional | Named after | Date | Site | Discoverer(s) | Category | Diam. | Ref |
|---|---|---|---|---|---|---|---|---|
| 884201 | 2017 DP_{95} | — | February 20, 2009 | Mount Lemmon | Mount Lemmon Survey | · | 660 m | MPC · JPL |
| 884202 | 2017 DY_{100} | — | February 22, 2017 | Haleakala | Pan-STARRS 1 | DOR | 1.5 km | MPC · JPL |
| 884203 | 2017 DE_{104} | — | November 20, 2015 | Mount Lemmon | Mount Lemmon Survey | T_{j} (2.74) | 4.5 km | MPC · JPL |
| 884204 | 2017 DX_{107} | — | January 4, 2017 | Haleakala | Pan-STARRS 1 | · | 1.5 km | MPC · JPL |
| 884205 | 2017 DY_{107} | — | January 4, 2017 | Haleakala | Pan-STARRS 1 | · | 1.6 km | MPC · JPL |
| 884206 | 2017 DU_{111} | — | December 6, 2005 | Kitt Peak | Spacewatch | critical | 1.6 km | MPC · JPL |
| 884207 | 2017 DC_{112} | — | June 6, 2013 | Mount Lemmon | Mount Lemmon Survey | · | 1.2 km | MPC · JPL |
| 884208 | 2017 DB_{122} | — | August 22, 2014 | Haleakala | Pan-STARRS 1 | · | 1.4 km | MPC · JPL |
| 884209 | 2017 DJ_{124} | — | February 24, 2017 | Haleakala | Pan-STARRS 1 | · | 900 m | MPC · JPL |
| 884210 | 2017 DZ_{124} | — | February 22, 2017 | Mount Lemmon | Mount Lemmon Survey | H | 330 m | MPC · JPL |
| 884211 | 2017 DZ_{126} | — | February 23, 2017 | Mount Lemmon | Mount Lemmon Survey | · | 1.1 km | MPC · JPL |
| 884212 | 2017 DS_{127} | — | February 22, 2017 | Mount Lemmon | Mount Lemmon Survey | TIR | 2.5 km | MPC · JPL |
| 884213 | 2017 DL_{128} | — | February 24, 2017 | Haleakala | Pan-STARRS 1 | · | 1.6 km | MPC · JPL |
| 884214 | 2017 DU_{132} | — | February 21, 2017 | Mount Lemmon | Mount Lemmon Survey | EOS | 1.7 km | MPC · JPL |
| 884215 | 2017 DX_{135} | — | February 18, 2017 | Haleakala | Pan-STARRS 1 | THM | 1.4 km | MPC · JPL |
| 884216 | 2017 DM_{137} | — | February 22, 2017 | Haleakala | Pan-STARRS 1 | · | 1.7 km | MPC · JPL |
| 884217 | 2017 DO_{137} | — | February 22, 2017 | Mount Lemmon | Mount Lemmon Survey | · | 880 m | MPC · JPL |
| 884218 | 2017 DO_{138} | — | February 18, 2017 | Haleakala | Pan-STARRS 1 | L5 · (17492) | 6.5 km | MPC · JPL |
| 884219 | 2017 DM_{142} | — | February 25, 2017 | Haleakala | Pan-STARRS 1 | · | 590 m | MPC · JPL |
| 884220 | 2017 DB_{146} | — | February 25, 2017 | Haleakala | Pan-STARRS 1 | · | 2.0 km | MPC · JPL |
| 884221 | 2017 DQ_{147} | — | January 27, 2017 | Mount Lemmon | Mount Lemmon Survey | · | 1.3 km | MPC · JPL |
| 884222 | 2017 DD_{148} | — | February 22, 2017 | Mount Lemmon | Mount Lemmon Survey | · | 1.3 km | MPC · JPL |
| 884223 | 2017 DV_{149} | — | February 18, 2017 | Haleakala | Pan-STARRS 1 | · | 1.4 km | MPC · JPL |
| 884224 | 2017 DT_{151} | — | February 24, 2017 | Haleakala | Pan-STARRS 1 | L5 | 6.5 km | MPC · JPL |
| 884225 | 2017 DQ_{168} | — | July 1, 2014 | Haleakala | Pan-STARRS 1 | · | 1.3 km | MPC · JPL |
| 884226 | 2017 EP_{5} | — | May 22, 1996 | La Silla | E. W. Elst | · | 1.8 km | MPC · JPL |
| 884227 | 2017 EL_{9} | — | January 23, 2006 | Kitt Peak | Spacewatch | · | 1.8 km | MPC · JPL |
| 884228 | 2017 EM_{10} | — | December 13, 2006 | Catalina | CSS | T_{j} (2.68) | 3.3 km | MPC · JPL |
| 884229 | 2017 EN_{11} | — | March 4, 2017 | Kitt Peak | Spacewatch | · | 1.7 km | MPC · JPL |
| 884230 | 2017 EK_{14} | — | February 7, 2008 | Kitt Peak | Spacewatch | · | 1.2 km | MPC · JPL |
| 884231 | 2017 EE_{15} | — | March 4, 2017 | Mount Lemmon | Mount Lemmon Survey | · | 2.0 km | MPC · JPL |
| 884232 | 2017 ET_{21} | — | March 7, 2017 | Haleakala | Pan-STARRS 1 | · | 2.3 km | MPC · JPL |
| 884233 | 2017 ES_{25} | — | March 5, 2017 | Haleakala | Pan-STARRS 1 | H | 370 m | MPC · JPL |
| 884234 | 2017 EW_{26} | — | March 7, 2017 | Haleakala | Pan-STARRS 1 | · | 950 m | MPC · JPL |
| 884235 | 2017 EA_{27} | — | September 10, 2015 | Haleakala | Pan-STARRS 1 | · | 1.1 km | MPC · JPL |
| 884236 | 2017 ES_{28} | — | March 3, 2017 | XuYi | PMO NEO Survey Program | LIX | 2.8 km | MPC · JPL |
| 884237 | 2017 EZ_{28} | — | March 4, 2017 | Mount Lemmon | Mount Lemmon Survey | H | 380 m | MPC · JPL |
| 884238 | 2017 EE_{29} | — | March 5, 2017 | Haleakala | Pan-STARRS 1 | · | 2.7 km | MPC · JPL |
| 884239 | 2017 EM_{32} | — | March 2, 2017 | Mount Lemmon | Mount Lemmon Survey | H | 340 m | MPC · JPL |
| 884240 | 2017 EO_{32} | — | March 4, 2017 | Haleakala | Pan-STARRS 1 | H | 340 m | MPC · JPL |
| 884241 | 2017 EE_{34} | — | March 4, 2017 | Haleakala | Pan-STARRS 1 | · | 1.9 km | MPC · JPL |
| 884242 | 2017 EF_{34} | — | March 8, 2017 | Mount Lemmon | Mount Lemmon Survey | · | 1.1 km | MPC · JPL |
| 884243 | 2017 EK_{35} | — | March 4, 2017 | Haleakala | Pan-STARRS 1 | · | 1.4 km | MPC · JPL |
| 884244 | 2017 ER_{35} | — | March 4, 2017 | Haleakala | Pan-STARRS 1 | · | 1.3 km | MPC · JPL |
| 884245 | 2017 EL_{37} | — | March 7, 2017 | Haleakala | Pan-STARRS 1 | · | 730 m | MPC · JPL |
| 884246 | 2017 EH_{41} | — | March 5, 2017 | Haleakala | Pan-STARRS 1 | · | 1.4 km | MPC · JPL |
| 884247 | 2017 EM_{42} | — | March 7, 2017 | Haleakala | Pan-STARRS 1 | · | 2.2 km | MPC · JPL |
| 884248 | 2017 EU_{59} | — | March 6, 2017 | Subaru Telescope, | Subaru Telescope | · | 610 m | MPC · JPL |
| 884249 | 2017 FJ_{2} | — | March 4, 2017 | Haleakala | Pan-STARRS 1 | H | 480 m | MPC · JPL |
| 884250 | 2017 FS_{5} | — | September 4, 2011 | Haleakala | Pan-STARRS 1 | · | 600 m | MPC · JPL |
| 884251 | 2017 FC_{6} | — | March 4, 2006 | Kitt Peak | Spacewatch | · | 2.1 km | MPC · JPL |
| 884252 | 2017 FF_{19} | — | December 9, 2015 | Haleakala | Pan-STARRS 1 | · | 950 m | MPC · JPL |
| 884253 | 2017 FE_{38} | — | October 8, 2015 | Haleakala | Pan-STARRS 1 | · | 1.2 km | MPC · JPL |
| 884254 | 2017 FH_{41} | — | October 8, 2015 | Haleakala | Pan-STARRS 1 | · | 1.5 km | MPC · JPL |
| 884255 | 2017 FJ_{41} | — | March 18, 2017 | Mount Lemmon | Mount Lemmon Survey | · | 1.0 km | MPC · JPL |
| 884256 | 2017 FU_{42} | — | January 27, 2017 | Haleakala | Pan-STARRS 1 | · | 990 m | MPC · JPL |
| 884257 | 2017 FK_{45} | — | February 28, 2012 | Haleakala | Pan-STARRS 1 | · | 1.3 km | MPC · JPL |
| 884258 | 2017 FB_{48} | — | May 27, 2014 | Mount Lemmon | Mount Lemmon Survey | · | 510 m | MPC · JPL |
| 884259 | 2017 FC_{63} | — | March 22, 2012 | Mount Lemmon | Mount Lemmon Survey | H | 370 m | MPC · JPL |
| 884260 | 2017 FL_{68} | — | January 2, 2011 | Mount Lemmon | Mount Lemmon Survey | · | 1.8 km | MPC · JPL |
| 884261 | 2017 FT_{73} | — | April 17, 2012 | Kitt Peak | Spacewatch | TIR | 2.0 km | MPC · JPL |
| 884262 | 2017 FV_{73} | — | February 7, 2011 | Mount Lemmon | Mount Lemmon Survey | TIR | 2.1 km | MPC · JPL |
| 884263 | 2017 FJ_{74} | — | March 19, 2017 | Haleakala | Pan-STARRS 1 | · | 1.7 km | MPC · JPL |
| 884264 | 2017 FQ_{74} | — | October 26, 2005 | Kitt Peak | Spacewatch | · | 1.4 km | MPC · JPL |
| 884265 | 2017 FZ_{77} | — | April 8, 2010 | Mount Lemmon | Mount Lemmon Survey | · | 540 m | MPC · JPL |
| 884266 | 2017 FQ_{78} | — | February 5, 2011 | Catalina | CSS | THB | 2.4 km | MPC · JPL |
| 884267 | 2017 FB_{81} | — | November 21, 2015 | Mount Lemmon | Mount Lemmon Survey | · | 1.5 km | MPC · JPL |
| 884268 | 2017 FW_{94} | — | November 16, 2014 | Mount Lemmon | Mount Lemmon Survey | T_{j} (2.99) | 2.8 km | MPC · JPL |
| 884269 | 2017 FC_{105} | — | March 3, 2008 | Kitt Peak | Spacewatch | · | 1.8 km | MPC · JPL |
| 884270 | 2017 FY_{106} | — | March 25, 2017 | Haleakala | Pan-STARRS 1 | · | 2.4 km | MPC · JPL |
| 884271 | 2017 FB_{111} | — | March 19, 2017 | Haleakala | Pan-STARRS 1 | · | 1.3 km | MPC · JPL |
| 884272 | 2017 FV_{122} | — | January 30, 2011 | Mount Lemmon | Mount Lemmon Survey | · | 2.1 km | MPC · JPL |
| 884273 | 2017 FO_{124} | — | January 2, 2017 | Haleakala | Pan-STARRS 1 | · | 1.3 km | MPC · JPL |
| 884274 | 2017 FJ_{125} | — | October 21, 2015 | Haleakala | Pan-STARRS 1 | TIR | 1.6 km | MPC · JPL |
| 884275 | 2017 FE_{127} | — | March 20, 2017 | Haleakala | Pan-STARRS 1 | · | 310 m | MPC · JPL |
| 884276 | 2017 FX_{129} | — | February 8, 2011 | Mount Lemmon | Mount Lemmon Survey | · | 1.8 km | MPC · JPL |
| 884277 | 2017 FP_{131} | — | March 2, 2011 | Mount Lemmon | Mount Lemmon Survey | · | 2.0 km | MPC · JPL |
| 884278 | 2017 FA_{153} | — | October 10, 2015 | Haleakala | Pan-STARRS 1 | · | 1.6 km | MPC · JPL |
| 884279 | 2017 FQ_{157} | — | March 19, 2017 | Mount Lemmon | Mount Lemmon Survey | · | 1.9 km | MPC · JPL |
| 884280 | 2017 FR_{163} | — | March 23, 2017 | Haleakala | Pan-STARRS 1 | · | 740 m | MPC · JPL |
| 884281 | 2017 FT_{165} | — | March 21, 2017 | Mount Lemmon | Mount Lemmon Survey | EUP | 2.6 km | MPC · JPL |
| 884282 | 2017 FL_{166} | — | March 20, 2017 | Haleakala | Pan-STARRS 1 | · | 1.8 km | MPC · JPL |
| 884283 | 2017 FQ_{166} | — | March 26, 2017 | Haleakala | Pan-STARRS 1 | · | 2.1 km | MPC · JPL |
| 884284 | 2017 FW_{168} | — | March 19, 2017 | Haleakala | Pan-STARRS 1 | · | 1.2 km | MPC · JPL |
| 884285 | 2017 FY_{168} | — | March 25, 2012 | Kitt Peak | Spacewatch | EOS | 1.6 km | MPC · JPL |
| 884286 | 2017 FE_{169} | — | March 27, 2017 | Haleakala | Pan-STARRS 1 | (895) | 2.6 km | MPC · JPL |
| 884287 | 2017 FN_{169} | — | March 26, 2017 | Mount Lemmon | Mount Lemmon Survey | · | 1.7 km | MPC · JPL |
| 884288 | 2017 FY_{169} | — | March 27, 2017 | Haleakala | Pan-STARRS 1 | EUN | 960 m | MPC · JPL |
| 884289 | 2017 FG_{173} | — | March 18, 2017 | Haleakala | Pan-STARRS 1 | KOR | 950 m | MPC · JPL |
| 884290 | 2017 FQ_{173} | — | March 27, 2017 | Haleakala | Pan-STARRS 1 | · | 2.2 km | MPC · JPL |
| 884291 | 2017 FX_{173} | — | March 20, 2017 | Haleakala | Pan-STARRS 1 | · | 470 m | MPC · JPL |
| 884292 | 2017 FD_{175} | — | March 29, 2017 | Haleakala | Pan-STARRS 1 | · | 1.5 km | MPC · JPL |
| 884293 | 2017 FO_{175} | — | March 19, 2017 | Haleakala | Pan-STARRS 1 | · | 1.3 km | MPC · JPL |
| 884294 | 2017 FD_{177} | — | March 20, 2017 | Haleakala | Pan-STARRS 1 | EOS | 1.2 km | MPC · JPL |
| 884295 | 2017 FQ_{180} | — | March 21, 2017 | Haleakala | Pan-STARRS 1 | EOS | 1.2 km | MPC · JPL |
| 884296 | 2017 FQ_{181} | — | March 19, 2017 | Haleakala | Pan-STARRS 1 | · | 880 m | MPC · JPL |
| 884297 | 2017 FV_{181} | — | March 21, 2017 | Haleakala | Pan-STARRS 1 | EOS | 1.2 km | MPC · JPL |
| 884298 | 2017 FL_{183} | — | March 20, 2017 | Haleakala | Pan-STARRS 1 | · | 1.2 km | MPC · JPL |
| 884299 | 2017 FG_{186} | — | March 18, 2017 | Mount Lemmon | Mount Lemmon Survey | · | 890 m | MPC · JPL |
| 884300 | 2017 FQ_{188} | — | March 21, 2017 | Mount Lemmon | Mount Lemmon Survey | TIR | 2.1 km | MPC · JPL |

== 884301–884400 ==
back to top

| Designation | | | Discovery | | | Properties | | Ref |
| Permanent | Provisional | Named after | Date | Site | Discoverer(s) | Category | Diam. | Ref |
|---|---|---|---|---|---|---|---|---|
| 884301 | 2017 FD_{198} | — | March 20, 2017 | Haleakala | Pan-STARRS 1 | · | 530 m | MPC · JPL |
| 884302 | 2017 FH_{198} | — | March 28, 2017 | Haleakala | Pan-STARRS 1 | V | 400 m | MPC · JPL |
| 884303 | 2017 FF_{206} | — | March 22, 2017 | Haleakala | Pan-STARRS 1 | · | 1.4 km | MPC · JPL |
| 884304 | 2017 FP_{216} | — | March 19, 2017 | Haleakala | Pan-STARRS 1 | · | 710 m | MPC · JPL |
| 884305 | 2017 FO_{218} | — | April 24, 2012 | Mount Lemmon | Mount Lemmon Survey | · | 2.0 km | MPC · JPL |
| 884306 | 2017 FT_{219} | — | March 21, 2017 | Haleakala | Pan-STARRS 1 | · | 1.5 km | MPC · JPL |
| 884307 | 2017 FP_{227} | — | March 23, 2017 | Subaru Telescope, | Subaru Telescope | · | 740 m | MPC · JPL |
| 884308 | 2017 FL_{236} | — | March 22, 2017 | Subaru Telescope, | Subaru Telescope | · | 2.0 km | MPC · JPL |
| 884309 | 2017 FM_{236} | — | March 22, 2017 | Subaru Telescope, | Subaru Telescope | · | 1.3 km | MPC · JPL |
| 884310 | 2017 FY_{243} | — | March 22, 2017 | Subaru Telescope, | Subaru Telescope | · | 630 m | MPC · JPL |
| 884311 | 2017 GV_{2} | — | March 7, 2017 | Haleakala | Pan-STARRS 1 | · | 1.7 km | MPC · JPL |
| 884312 | 2017 GZ_{4} | — | February 16, 2017 | Mount Lemmon | Mount Lemmon Survey | PAL | 1.3 km | MPC · JPL |
| 884313 | 2017 GX_{5} | — | April 5, 2017 | Haleakala | Pan-STARRS 1 | H | 370 m | MPC · JPL |
| 884314 | 2017 GP_{8} | — | April 14, 2008 | Kitt Peak | Spacewatch | DOR | 1.8 km | MPC · JPL |
| 884315 | 2017 GA_{11} | — | April 6, 2017 | Haleakala | Pan-STARRS 1 | H | 370 m | MPC · JPL |
| 884316 | 2017 GZ_{11} | — | April 6, 2017 | Haleakala | Pan-STARRS 1 | · | 2.3 km | MPC · JPL |
| 884317 | 2017 GA_{13} | — | April 3, 2017 | Mount Lemmon | Mount Lemmon Survey | · | 2.8 km | MPC · JPL |
| 884318 | 2017 GB_{13} | — | April 3, 2017 | Haleakala | Pan-STARRS 1 | · | 930 m | MPC · JPL |
| 884319 | 2017 GC_{14} | — | April 3, 2017 | Haleakala | Pan-STARRS 1 | PHO | 680 m | MPC · JPL |
| 884320 | 2017 GM_{14} | — | April 7, 2017 | Mount Lemmon | Mount Lemmon Survey | · | 2.9 km | MPC · JPL |
| 884321 | 2017 GN_{14} | — | April 7, 2017 | Haleakala | Pan-STARRS 1 | PHO | 600 m | MPC · JPL |
| 884322 | 2017 GN_{15} | — | April 6, 2017 | Haleakala | Pan-STARRS 1 | · | 2.5 km | MPC · JPL |
| 884323 | 2017 GC_{18} | — | April 3, 2017 | Haleakala | Pan-STARRS 1 | V | 510 m | MPC · JPL |
| 884324 | 2017 GU_{19} | — | April 6, 2017 | Mount Lemmon | Mount Lemmon Survey | · | 1.6 km | MPC · JPL |
| 884325 | 2017 GO_{20} | — | April 4, 2017 | Haleakala | Pan-STARRS 1 | · | 1.3 km | MPC · JPL |
| 884326 | 2017 GR_{22} | — | April 3, 2017 | Mount Lemmon | Mount Lemmon Survey | · | 790 m | MPC · JPL |
| 884327 | 2017 GP_{32} | — | April 1, 2017 | Haleakala | Pan-STARRS 1 | · | 2.3 km | MPC · JPL |
| 884328 | 2017 GX_{37} | — | April 3, 2017 | Haleakala | Pan-STARRS 1 | · | 1.8 km | MPC · JPL |
| 884329 | 2017 HO | — | April 18, 2017 | Mount Lemmon | Mount Lemmon Survey | H | 410 m | MPC · JPL |
| 884330 | 2017 HP | — | October 19, 2010 | Mount Lemmon | Mount Lemmon Survey | H | 360 m | MPC · JPL |
| 884331 | 2017 HF_{11} | — | March 19, 2017 | Mount Lemmon | Mount Lemmon Survey | · | 2.3 km | MPC · JPL |
| 884332 | 2017 HH_{11} | — | April 22, 2009 | Mount Lemmon | Mount Lemmon Survey | · | 600 m | MPC · JPL |
| 884333 | 2017 HP_{17} | — | April 19, 2017 | Mount Lemmon | Mount Lemmon Survey | · | 820 m | MPC · JPL |
| 884334 | 2017 HY_{20} | — | April 1, 2017 | Haleakala | Pan-STARRS 1 | · | 530 m | MPC · JPL |
| 884335 | 2017 HN_{23} | — | July 10, 2000 | Anderson Mesa | LONEOS | · | 940 m | MPC · JPL |
| 884336 | 2017 HL_{32} | — | March 21, 2017 | Haleakala | Pan-STARRS 1 | · | 1.3 km | MPC · JPL |
| 884337 | 2017 HT_{35} | — | April 26, 2017 | Haleakala | Pan-STARRS 1 | · | 710 m | MPC · JPL |
| 884338 | 2017 HJ_{46} | — | September 6, 2013 | Mount Lemmon | Mount Lemmon Survey | · | 2.0 km | MPC · JPL |
| 884339 | 2017 HD_{51} | — | September 19, 2014 | Haleakala | Pan-STARRS 1 | · | 990 m | MPC · JPL |
| 884340 | 2017 HM_{62} | — | January 17, 2016 | Haleakala | Pan-STARRS 1 | · | 2.5 km | MPC · JPL |
| 884341 | 2017 HL_{63} | — | April 26, 2017 | Haleakala | Pan-STARRS 1 | · | 810 m | MPC · JPL |
| 884342 | 2017 HR_{65} | — | April 23, 2017 | Mount Lemmon | Mount Lemmon Survey | H | 440 m | MPC · JPL |
| 884343 | 2017 HN_{67} | — | April 6, 2017 | Haleakala | Pan-STARRS 1 | · | 1.6 km | MPC · JPL |
| 884344 | 2017 HT_{67} | — | April 27, 2017 | Haleakala | Pan-STARRS 1 | · | 2.6 km | MPC · JPL |
| 884345 | 2017 HQ_{68} | — | April 20, 2017 | Haleakala | Pan-STARRS 1 | · | 2.1 km | MPC · JPL |
| 884346 | 2017 HL_{71} | — | April 18, 2017 | Mount Lemmon | Mount Lemmon Survey | H | 380 m | MPC · JPL |
| 884347 | 2017 HU_{76} | — | April 28, 2017 | Haleakala | Pan-STARRS 1 | · | 580 m | MPC · JPL |
| 884348 | 2017 HN_{77} | — | April 17, 2017 | Mount Lemmon | Mount Lemmon Survey | EUN | 790 m | MPC · JPL |
| 884349 | 2017 HU_{83} | — | April 26, 2017 | Haleakala | Pan-STARRS 1 | · | 990 m | MPC · JPL |
| 884350 | 2017 HG_{84} | — | April 24, 2017 | Mauna Kea | Heinze, A. N. | · | 350 m | MPC · JPL |
| 884351 | 2017 HG_{86} | — | April 27, 2017 | Haleakala | Pan-STARRS 1 | · | 1.8 km | MPC · JPL |
| 884352 | 2017 HC_{88} | — | April 25, 2017 | Haleakala | Pan-STARRS 1 | · | 1.9 km | MPC · JPL |
| 884353 | 2017 HH_{100} | — | April 26, 2017 | Haleakala | Pan-STARRS 1 | · | 1.7 km | MPC · JPL |
| 884354 | 2017 JK | — | March 11, 2011 | Mount Lemmon | Mount Lemmon Survey | · | 2.2 km | MPC · JPL |
| 884355 | 2017 JD_{5} | — | January 4, 2016 | Haleakala | Pan-STARRS 1 | · | 1.5 km | MPC · JPL |
| 884356 | 2017 JP_{6} | — | May 6, 2017 | Haleakala | Pan-STARRS 1 | · | 890 m | MPC · JPL |
| 884357 | 2017 JY_{6} | — | May 2, 2017 | Mount Lemmon | Mount Lemmon Survey | H | 390 m | MPC · JPL |
| 884358 | 2017 JJ_{7} | — | May 6, 2017 | Haleakala | Pan-STARRS 1 | · | 2.1 km | MPC · JPL |
| 884359 | 2017 JC_{8} | — | May 4, 2017 | Haleakala | Pan-STARRS 1 | · | 1.7 km | MPC · JPL |
| 884360 | 2017 JF_{9} | — | May 2, 2017 | Mount Lemmon | Mount Lemmon Survey | · | 930 m | MPC · JPL |
| 884361 | 2017 JC_{10} | — | May 2, 2017 | Mount Lemmon | Mount Lemmon Survey | RAF | 640 m | MPC · JPL |
| 884362 | 2017 JP_{10} | — | August 27, 2014 | Haleakala | Pan-STARRS 1 | · | 690 m | MPC · JPL |
| 884363 | 2017 JA_{13} | — | May 6, 2017 | Haleakala | Pan-STARRS 1 | THB | 2.0 km | MPC · JPL |
| 884364 | 2017 KH_{2} | — | May 13, 2012 | Mount Lemmon | Mount Lemmon Survey | H | 320 m | MPC · JPL |
| 884365 | 2017 KT_{3} | — | December 25, 2000 | Kitt Peak | Spacewatch | · | 700 m | MPC · JPL |
| 884366 | 2017 KD_{6} | — | May 27, 2009 | Mount Lemmon | Mount Lemmon Survey | · | 910 m | MPC · JPL |
| 884367 | 2017 KS_{11} | — | May 23, 2010 | WISE | WISE | ERI | 1.6 km | MPC · JPL |
| 884368 | 2017 KD_{13} | — | December 13, 2010 | Mount Lemmon | Mount Lemmon Survey | · | 1.3 km | MPC · JPL |
| 884369 | 2017 KQ_{18} | — | February 6, 2016 | Haleakala | Pan-STARRS 1 | VER | 2.1 km | MPC · JPL |
| 884370 | 2017 KX_{21} | — | September 16, 2009 | Catalina | CSS | JUN | 730 m | MPC · JPL |
| 884371 | 2017 KC_{27} | — | May 20, 2017 | Mount Lemmon | Mount Lemmon Survey | · | 570 m | MPC · JPL |
| 884372 | 2017 KX_{34} | — | October 14, 2015 | XuYi | PMO NEO Survey Program | H | 250 m | MPC · JPL |
| 884373 | 2017 KD_{38} | — | September 17, 2004 | Anderson Mesa | LONEOS | · | 1.0 km | MPC · JPL |
| 884374 | 2017 KQ_{38} | — | May 17, 2017 | Haleakala | Pan-STARRS 1 | · | 2.2 km | MPC · JPL |
| 884375 | 2017 KM_{41} | — | May 30, 2017 | Haleakala | Pan-STARRS 1 | · | 1.0 km | MPC · JPL |
| 884376 | 2017 KB_{43} | — | May 21, 2017 | Haleakala | Pan-STARRS 1 | · | 1.2 km | MPC · JPL |
| 884377 | 2017 KJ_{44} | — | May 21, 2017 | Haleakala | Pan-STARRS 1 | NYS | 950 m | MPC · JPL |
| 884378 | 2017 KR_{44} | — | May 24, 2017 | Haleakala | Pan-STARRS 1 | · | 850 m | MPC · JPL |
| 884379 | 2017 KL_{47} | — | May 29, 2017 | Haleakala | Pan-STARRS 1 | T_{j} (2.96) | 2.3 km | MPC · JPL |
| 884380 | 2017 KX_{49} | — | May 24, 2017 | ESA OGS | ESA OGS | · | 2.5 km | MPC · JPL |
| 884381 | 2017 KA_{52} | — | May 17, 2017 | Haleakala | Pan-STARRS 1 | URS | 2.2 km | MPC · JPL |
| 884382 | 2017 LC_{1} | — | December 1, 2005 | Palomar | NEAT | H | 480 m | MPC · JPL |
| 884383 | 2017 LY_{2} | — | June 13, 2017 | Mount Lemmon | Mount Lemmon Survey | · | 710 m | MPC · JPL |
| 884384 | 2017 LJ_{3} | — | June 14, 2017 | Mount Lemmon | Mount Lemmon Survey | · | 910 m | MPC · JPL |
| 884385 | 2017 ME | — | June 16, 2017 | Catalina | CSS | APO +1km | 990 m | MPC · JPL |
| 884386 | 2017 MX | — | January 10, 2010 | Kitt Peak | Spacewatch | · | 1.0 km | MPC · JPL |
| 884387 | 2017 MN_{2} | — | November 13, 2006 | Kitt Peak | Spacewatch | T_{j} (2.96) | 2.2 km | MPC · JPL |
| 884388 | 2017 MP_{3} | — | June 23, 2017 | Haleakala | Pan-STARRS 1 | · | 380 m | MPC · JPL |
| 884389 | 2017 MS_{3} | — | November 28, 2014 | Haleakala | Pan-STARRS 1 | · | 650 m | MPC · JPL |
| 884390 | 2017 MZ_{10} | — | June 30, 2017 | Mount Lemmon | Mount Lemmon Survey | · | 970 m | MPC · JPL |
| 884391 | 2017 MH_{12} | — | June 30, 2017 | Mount Lemmon | Mount Lemmon Survey | · | 2.1 km | MPC · JPL |
| 884392 | 2017 MX_{13} | — | June 24, 2017 | Haleakala | Pan-STARRS 1 | · | 980 m | MPC · JPL |
| 884393 | 2017 MR_{15} | — | June 21, 2017 | Haleakala | Pan-STARRS 1 | · | 2.3 km | MPC · JPL |
| 884394 | 2017 MU_{20} | — | June 25, 2017 | Haleakala | Pan-STARRS 1 | · | 2.9 km | MPC · JPL |
| 884395 | 2017 MH_{22} | — | June 3, 2017 | Kitt Peak | Spacewatch | · | 1.0 km | MPC · JPL |
| 884396 | 2017 MT_{22} | — | March 28, 2016 | Cerro Tololo | DECam | · | 810 m | MPC · JPL |
| 884397 | 2017 MJ_{23} | — | June 25, 2017 | Haleakala | Pan-STARRS 1 | · | 860 m | MPC · JPL |
| 884398 | 2017 MC_{30} | — | June 25, 2017 | Haleakala | Pan-STARRS 1 | · | 1.0 km | MPC · JPL |
| 884399 | 2017 ME_{31} | — | June 20, 2017 | Haleakala | Pan-STARRS 1 | · | 910 m | MPC · JPL |
| 884400 | 2017 MG_{31} | — | June 22, 2017 | Haleakala | Pan-STARRS 1 | · | 1.4 km | MPC · JPL |

== 884401–884500 ==
back to top

| Designation | | | Discovery | | | Properties | | Ref |
| Permanent | Provisional | Named after | Date | Site | Discoverer(s) | Category | Diam. | Ref |
|---|---|---|---|---|---|---|---|---|
| 884401 | 2017 MZ_{34} | — | June 25, 2017 | Haleakala | Pan-STARRS 1 | LUT | 3.1 km | MPC · JPL |
| 884402 | 2017 NH_{6} | — | April 26, 2017 | Haleakala | Pan-STARRS 1 | EUP | 2.8 km | MPC · JPL |
| 884403 | 2017 NQ_{6} | — | July 10, 2017 | Haleakala | Pan-STARRS 1 | APO | 460 m | MPC · JPL |
| 884404 | 2017 NU_{8} | — | June 30, 2017 | Mount Lemmon | Mount Lemmon Survey | EOS | 1.5 km | MPC · JPL |
| 884405 | 2017 NJ_{9} | — | July 5, 2017 | Haleakala | Pan-STARRS 1 | MAS | 530 m | MPC · JPL |
| 884406 | 2017 NR_{9} | — | July 4, 2017 | Haleakala | Pan-STARRS 1 | PHO | 540 m | MPC · JPL |
| 884407 | 2017 NV_{9} | — | July 5, 2017 | Haleakala | Pan-STARRS 1 | · | 1.3 km | MPC · JPL |
| 884408 | 2017 NC_{11} | — | July 4, 2017 | Haleakala | Pan-STARRS 1 | · | 1.1 km | MPC · JPL |
| 884409 | 2017 NH_{12} | — | July 5, 2017 | Haleakala | Pan-STARRS 1 | · | 1.7 km | MPC · JPL |
| 884410 | 2017 NF_{20} | — | July 5, 2017 | Haleakala | Pan-STARRS 1 | · | 1.7 km | MPC · JPL |
| 884411 | 2017 NL_{20} | — | July 4, 2017 | Haleakala | Pan-STARRS 1 | · | 780 m | MPC · JPL |
| 884412 | 2017 NX_{20} | — | July 4, 2017 | Haleakala | Pan-STARRS 1 | · | 960 m | MPC · JPL |
| 884413 | 2017 ON_{5} | — | September 4, 2002 | Palomar | NEAT | PHO | 600 m | MPC · JPL |
| 884414 | 2017 OF_{14} | — | June 24, 2017 | Haleakala | Pan-STARRS 1 | critical | 1.9 km | MPC · JPL |
| 884415 | 2017 OS_{25} | — | July 26, 2017 | Haleakala | Pan-STARRS 1 | · | 790 m | MPC · JPL |
| 884416 | 2017 OP_{38} | — | October 5, 2013 | Haleakala | Pan-STARRS 1 | · | 770 m | MPC · JPL |
| 884417 | 2017 OY_{38} | — | July 27, 2017 | Haleakala | Pan-STARRS 1 | · | 1.2 km | MPC · JPL |
| 884418 | 2017 OB_{48} | — | July 27, 2017 | Haleakala | Pan-STARRS 1 | LIX | 2.4 km | MPC · JPL |
| 884419 | 2017 OX_{50} | — | March 10, 2016 | Mount Lemmon | Mount Lemmon Survey | JUN | 750 m | MPC · JPL |
| 884420 | 2017 OH_{64} | — | October 1, 2005 | Wrightwood | J. W. Young | · | 650 m | MPC · JPL |
| 884421 | 2017 OE_{65} | — | July 30, 2017 | Haleakala | Pan-STARRS 1 | V | 450 m | MPC · JPL |
| 884422 | 2017 OD_{66} | — | September 18, 2009 | Mount Lemmon | Mount Lemmon Survey | · | 600 m | MPC · JPL |
| 884423 | 2017 OU_{69} | — | October 19, 2006 | Kitt Peak | Deep Ecliptic Survey | · | 870 m | MPC · JPL |
| 884424 | 2017 OU_{70} | — | July 30, 2017 | Haleakala | Pan-STARRS 1 | NYS | 840 m | MPC · JPL |
| 884425 | 2017 OV_{71} | — | July 30, 2017 | Haleakala | Pan-STARRS 1 | · | 770 m | MPC · JPL |
| 884426 | 2017 OQ_{72} | — | July 30, 2017 | Haleakala | Pan-STARRS 1 | · | 1.5 km | MPC · JPL |
| 884427 | 2017 OJ_{74} | — | July 21, 2017 | ESA OGS | ESA OGS | NYS | 760 m | MPC · JPL |
| 884428 | 2017 OB_{75} | — | July 27, 2017 | Haleakala | Pan-STARRS 1 | MAR · critical | 580 m | MPC · JPL |
| 884429 | 2017 OT_{77} | — | July 25, 2017 | Haleakala | Pan-STARRS 1 | · | 730 m | MPC · JPL |
| 884430 | 2017 OZ_{77} | — | July 30, 2017 | Haleakala | Pan-STARRS 1 | · | 780 m | MPC · JPL |
| 884431 | 2017 OO_{79} | — | July 29, 2017 | Haleakala | Pan-STARRS 1 | 3:2 · (3561) | 3.8 km | MPC · JPL |
| 884432 | 2017 OJ_{84} | — | July 26, 2017 | Haleakala | Pan-STARRS 1 | · | 520 m | MPC · JPL |
| 884433 | 2017 OX_{84} | — | July 25, 2017 | Haleakala | Pan-STARRS 1 | · | 1.7 km | MPC · JPL |
| 884434 | 2017 OY_{84} | — | July 25, 2017 | Haleakala | Pan-STARRS 1 | 3:2 | 5.1 km | MPC · JPL |
| 884435 | 2017 OO_{86} | — | July 30, 2017 | Haleakala | Pan-STARRS 1 | NYS | 760 m | MPC · JPL |
| 884436 | 2017 OY_{86} | — | July 26, 2017 | Haleakala | Pan-STARRS 1 | · | 810 m | MPC · JPL |
| 884437 | 2017 OQ_{92} | — | July 25, 2017 | Haleakala | Pan-STARRS 1 | H | 350 m | MPC · JPL |
| 884438 | 2017 OE_{95} | — | July 30, 2017 | Haleakala | Pan-STARRS 1 | MAS | 490 m | MPC · JPL |
| 884439 | 2017 OA_{98} | — | July 5, 2017 | Haleakala | Pan-STARRS 1 | 3:2 · SHU | 4.1 km | MPC · JPL |
| 884440 | 2017 OG_{99} | — | July 29, 2017 | Haleakala | Pan-STARRS 1 | EUN | 880 m | MPC · JPL |
| 884441 | 2017 OD_{101} | — | July 27, 2017 | Haleakala | Pan-STARRS 1 | · | 2.3 km | MPC · JPL |
| 884442 | 2017 OG_{103} | — | July 29, 2017 | Haleakala | Pan-STARRS 1 | TIR | 2.6 km | MPC · JPL |
| 884443 | 2017 OX_{105} | — | July 26, 2017 | Haleakala | Pan-STARRS 1 | EOS | 1.4 km | MPC · JPL |
| 884444 | 2017 OG_{112} | — | April 30, 2016 | Haleakala | Pan-STARRS 1 | · | 1.9 km | MPC · JPL |
| 884445 | 2017 OQ_{115} | — | July 24, 2017 | Haleakala | Pan-STARRS 1 | · | 1.2 km | MPC · JPL |
| 884446 | 2017 OB_{126} | — | July 25, 2017 | Haleakala | Pan-STARRS 1 | · | 680 m | MPC · JPL |
| 884447 | 2017 OH_{127} | — | July 26, 2017 | Haleakala | Pan-STARRS 1 | NYS | 600 m | MPC · JPL |
| 884448 | 2017 OE_{129} | — | July 30, 2017 | Haleakala | Pan-STARRS 1 | · | 350 m | MPC · JPL |
| 884449 | 2017 OA_{143} | — | July 25, 2017 | Haleakala | Pan-STARRS 1 | · | 2.8 km | MPC · JPL |
| 884450 | 2017 OA_{150} | — | July 26, 2017 | Haleakala | Pan-STARRS 1 | DOR | 1.6 km | MPC · JPL |
| 884451 | 2017 OC_{153} | — | November 9, 2013 | Haleakala | Pan-STARRS 1 | · | 1.3 km | MPC · JPL |
| 884452 | 2017 OY_{171} | — | July 26, 2017 | Haleakala | Pan-STARRS 1 | · | 1.9 km | MPC · JPL |
| 884453 | 2017 OC_{178} | — | July 27, 2017 | Haleakala | Pan-STARRS 1 | TIR | 2.1 km | MPC · JPL |
| 884454 | 2017 PC | — | August 1, 2017 | Haleakala | Pan-STARRS 1 | H | 400 m | MPC · JPL |
| 884455 | 2017 PX_{11} | — | August 1, 2017 | Haleakala | Pan-STARRS 1 | · | 990 m | MPC · JPL |
| 884456 | 2017 PH_{23} | — | September 19, 2007 | Kitt Peak | Spacewatch | · | 1.3 km | MPC · JPL |
| 884457 | 2017 PU_{24} | — | October 23, 2006 | Catalina | CSS | · | 2.6 km | MPC · JPL |
| 884458 | 2017 PA_{25} | — | March 28, 2008 | Mount Lemmon | Mount Lemmon Survey | · | 1.0 km | MPC · JPL |
| 884459 | 2017 PY_{30} | — | August 8, 2017 | Haleakala | Pan-STARRS 1 | H | 520 m | MPC · JPL |
| 884460 | 2017 PO_{32} | — | July 30, 2017 | Haleakala | Pan-STARRS 1 | NYS | 830 m | MPC · JPL |
| 884461 | 2017 PM_{42} | — | August 3, 2017 | Haleakala | Pan-STARRS 1 | · | 830 m | MPC · JPL |
| 884462 | 2017 PS_{43} | — | August 3, 2017 | Haleakala | Pan-STARRS 1 | · | 930 m | MPC · JPL |
| 884463 | 2017 PB_{44} | — | August 4, 2017 | Haleakala | Pan-STARRS 1 | · | 870 m | MPC · JPL |
| 884464 | 2017 PH_{44} | — | August 4, 2017 | Haleakala | Pan-STARRS 1 | · | 820 m | MPC · JPL |
| 884465 | 2017 PM_{44} | — | August 4, 2017 | Haleakala | Pan-STARRS 1 | · | 670 m | MPC · JPL |
| 884466 | 2017 PA_{45} | — | August 1, 2017 | Haleakala | Pan-STARRS 1 | · | 670 m | MPC · JPL |
| 884467 | 2017 PU_{45} | — | October 5, 2004 | Palomar | NEAT | · | 880 m | MPC · JPL |
| 884468 | 2017 PC_{46} | — | August 3, 2017 | Haleakala | Pan-STARRS 1 | (5) | 680 m | MPC · JPL |
| 884469 | 2017 PN_{46} | — | August 1, 2017 | Haleakala | Pan-STARRS 1 | · | 730 m | MPC · JPL |
| 884470 | 2017 PF_{47} | — | August 6, 2017 | Haleakala | Pan-STARRS 1 | T_{j} (2.95) · 3:2 | 4.4 km | MPC · JPL |
| 884471 | 2017 PX_{48} | — | August 4, 2017 | Haleakala | Pan-STARRS 1 | EUN | 850 m | MPC · JPL |
| 884472 | 2017 PY_{48} | — | August 3, 2017 | Haleakala | Pan-STARRS 1 | · | 910 m | MPC · JPL |
| 884473 | 2017 PC_{49} | — | August 4, 2017 | Haleakala | Pan-STARRS 1 | · | 1 km | MPC · JPL |
| 884474 | 2017 PA_{51} | — | August 4, 2017 | Haleakala | Pan-STARRS 1 | · | 1.0 km | MPC · JPL |
| 884475 | 2017 PB_{51} | — | August 1, 2017 | Haleakala | Pan-STARRS 1 | · | 900 m | MPC · JPL |
| 884476 | 2017 PA_{53} | — | August 1, 2017 | Haleakala | Pan-STARRS 1 | · | 1.4 km | MPC · JPL |
| 884477 | 2017 PR_{54} | — | August 1, 2017 | Haleakala | Pan-STARRS 1 | · | 2.0 km | MPC · JPL |
| 884478 | 2017 PK_{57} | — | August 1, 2017 | Haleakala | Pan-STARRS 1 | · | 700 m | MPC · JPL |
| 884479 | 2017 PD_{61} | — | March 23, 2015 | Kitt Peak | L. H. Wasserman, M. W. Buie | · | 2.5 km | MPC · JPL |
| 884480 | 2017 PZ_{65} | — | August 4, 2017 | Haleakala | Pan-STARRS 1 | · | 900 m | MPC · JPL |
| 884481 | 2017 PD_{66} | — | October 24, 1993 | Kitt Peak | Spacewatch | · | 780 m | MPC · JPL |
| 884482 | 2017 PG_{68} | — | August 13, 2017 | Haleakala | Pan-STARRS 1 | TIR | 2.1 km | MPC · JPL |
| 884483 | 2017 PY_{83} | — | August 15, 2017 | Haleakala | Pan-STARRS 1 | · | 1.9 km | MPC · JPL |
| 884484 | 2017 QT | — | August 16, 2017 | Oukaïmeden | C. Rinner | · | 850 m | MPC · JPL |
| 884485 | 2017 QQ_{2} | — | June 25, 2017 | Haleakala | Pan-STARRS 1 | H | 490 m | MPC · JPL |
| 884486 | 2017 QQ_{3} | — | July 31, 2008 | Mount Lemmon | Mount Lemmon Survey | · | 1.4 km | MPC · JPL |
| 884487 | 2017 QT_{6} | — | July 26, 2017 | Haleakala | Pan-STARRS 1 | T_{j} (2.98) · 3:2 | 2.7 km | MPC · JPL |
| 884488 | 2017 QV_{8} | — | January 24, 2015 | Haleakala | Pan-STARRS 1 | · | 870 m | MPC · JPL |
| 884489 | 2017 QK_{17} | — | December 4, 2015 | Haleakala | Pan-STARRS 1 | H | 310 m | MPC · JPL |
| 884490 | 2017 QZ_{17} | — | August 24, 2017 | Haleakala | Pan-STARRS 1 | H | 390 m | MPC · JPL |
| 884491 | 2017 QN_{24} | — | January 22, 2015 | Haleakala | Pan-STARRS 1 | · | 890 m | MPC · JPL |
| 884492 | 2017 QB_{34} | — | August 26, 2017 | SATINO Remote | J. Jahn | critical | 2.3 km | MPC · JPL |
| 884493 | 2017 QF_{36} | — | September 14, 2013 | Mount Lemmon | Mount Lemmon Survey | · | 170 m | MPC · JPL |
| 884494 | 2017 QQ_{62} | — | August 17, 2012 | ESA OGS | ESA OGS | · | 1.6 km | MPC · JPL |
| 884495 | 2017 QJ_{65} | — | July 26, 2017 | Haleakala | Pan-STARRS 1 | · | 1.8 km | MPC · JPL |
| 884496 | 2017 QO_{66} | — | September 9, 2013 | Haleakala | Pan-STARRS 1 | · | 620 m | MPC · JPL |
| 884497 | 2017 QP_{69} | — | May 10, 2015 | Mount Lemmon | Mount Lemmon Survey | 3:2 | 4.0 km | MPC · JPL |
| 884498 | 2017 QN_{85} | — | April 18, 2015 | Cerro Tololo | DECam | 3:2 · SHU | 3.2 km | MPC · JPL |
| 884499 | 2017 QU_{86} | — | August 24, 2017 | Haleakala | Pan-STARRS 1 | · | 880 m | MPC · JPL |
| 884500 | 2017 QL_{94} | — | August 23, 2017 | Haleakala | Pan-STARRS 1 | · | 1.6 km | MPC · JPL |

== 884501–884600 ==
back to top

| Designation | | | Discovery | | | Properties | | Ref |
| Permanent | Provisional | Named after | Date | Site | Discoverer(s) | Category | Diam. | Ref |
|---|---|---|---|---|---|---|---|---|
| 884501 | 2017 QZ_{94} | — | August 23, 2017 | Haleakala | Pan-STARRS 1 | · | 2.4 km | MPC · JPL |
| 884502 | 2017 QV_{95} | — | August 24, 2017 | Haleakala | Pan-STARRS 1 | · | 1.1 km | MPC · JPL |
| 884503 | 2017 QC_{96} | — | August 24, 2017 | Haleakala | Pan-STARRS 1 | NYS | 800 m | MPC · JPL |
| 884504 | 2017 QO_{96} | — | May 1, 2016 | Cerro Tololo | DECam | · | 480 m | MPC · JPL |
| 884505 | 2017 QS_{100} | — | May 3, 2016 | Cerro Tololo | DECam | · | 650 m | MPC · JPL |
| 884506 | 2017 QL_{103} | — | August 18, 2017 | Haleakala | Pan-STARRS 1 | · | 2.7 km | MPC · JPL |
| 884507 | 2017 QO_{117} | — | August 24, 2017 | Haleakala | Pan-STARRS 1 | EOS | 1.4 km | MPC · JPL |
| 884508 | 2017 QJ_{119} | — | August 16, 2017 | Haleakala | Pan-STARRS 1 | · | 1.6 km | MPC · JPL |
| 884509 | 2017 QP_{125} | — | August 24, 2017 | Haleakala | Pan-STARRS 1 | · | 850 m | MPC · JPL |
| 884510 | 2017 QD_{132} | — | May 1, 2016 | Cerro Tololo | DECam | · | 610 m | MPC · JPL |
| 884511 | 2017 QQ_{132} | — | August 18, 2017 | Haleakala | Pan-STARRS 1 | CLA | 1.1 km | MPC · JPL |
| 884512 | 2017 QB_{134} | — | August 18, 2017 | Haleakala | Pan-STARRS 1 | · | 600 m | MPC · JPL |
| 884513 | 2017 QA_{159} | — | August 16, 2017 | Haleakala | Pan-STARRS 1 | · | 1.0 km | MPC · JPL |
| 884514 | 2017 QD_{181} | — | August 16, 2017 | Haleakala | Pan-STARRS 1 | · | 2.8 km | MPC · JPL |
| 884515 | 2017 QE_{187} | — | August 31, 2017 | Haleakala | Pan-STARRS 1 | · | 2.2 km | MPC · JPL |
| 884516 | 2017 RG | — | June 17, 2013 | Haleakala | Pan-STARRS 1 | · | 930 m | MPC · JPL |
| 884517 | 2017 RJ_{1} | — | September 24, 2008 | Kitt Peak | Spacewatch | · | 920 m | MPC · JPL |
| 884518 | 2017 RY_{14} | — | March 15, 2004 | Kitt Peak | Spacewatch | · | 860 m | MPC · JPL |
| 884519 | 2017 RW_{20} | — | March 18, 2010 | Kitt Peak | Spacewatch | · | 3.2 km | MPC · JPL |
| 884520 | 2017 RL_{26} | — | August 15, 2013 | Haleakala | Pan-STARRS 1 | · | 640 m | MPC · JPL |
| 884521 | 2017 RB_{27} | — | March 28, 2016 | Cerro Tololo | DECam | · | 950 m | MPC · JPL |
| 884522 | 2017 RN_{28} | — | September 14, 2010 | Mount Lemmon | Mount Lemmon Survey | · | 890 m | MPC · JPL |
| 884523 | 2017 RN_{29} | — | January 27, 2011 | Mount Lemmon | Mount Lemmon Survey | · | 790 m | MPC · JPL |
| 884524 | 2017 RO_{48} | — | September 14, 2017 | Haleakala | Pan-STARRS 1 | · | 1 km | MPC · JPL |
| 884525 | 2017 RB_{54} | — | September 14, 2017 | Haleakala | Pan-STARRS 1 | AGN | 650 m | MPC · JPL |
| 884526 | 2017 RG_{66} | — | July 30, 2017 | Haleakala | Pan-STARRS 1 | T_{j} (2.99) · EUP | 1.9 km | MPC · JPL |
| 884527 | 2017 RK_{69} | — | August 28, 2017 | Mount Lemmon | Mount Lemmon Survey | NYS | 830 m | MPC · JPL |
| 884528 | 2017 RA_{80} | — | April 18, 2015 | Cerro Tololo | DECam | T_{j} (2.96) | 2.6 km | MPC · JPL |
| 884529 | 2017 RV_{86} | — | September 26, 2006 | Kitt Peak | Spacewatch | · | 1.8 km | MPC · JPL |
| 884530 | 2017 RF_{89} | — | August 9, 2013 | Kitt Peak | Spacewatch | NYS | 880 m | MPC · JPL |
| 884531 | 2017 RG_{90} | — | February 16, 2010 | Mount Lemmon | Mount Lemmon Survey | KOR | 1.0 km | MPC · JPL |
| 884532 | 2017 RF_{94} | — | September 15, 2017 | Haleakala | Pan-STARRS 1 | · | 1.7 km | MPC · JPL |
| 884533 | 2017 RD_{107} | — | August 8, 2013 | Haleakala | Pan-STARRS 1 | · | 760 m | MPC · JPL |
| 884534 | 2017 RL_{110} | — | September 2, 2017 | Haleakala | Pan-STARRS 1 | · | 2.3 km | MPC · JPL |
| 884535 | 2017 RQ_{110} | — | September 13, 2017 | Haleakala | Pan-STARRS 1 | HNS | 810 m | MPC · JPL |
| 884536 | 2017 RG_{111} | — | September 2, 2017 | Haleakala | Pan-STARRS 1 | · | 1.0 km | MPC · JPL |
| 884537 | 2017 RM_{111} | — | September 1, 2017 | Haleakala | Pan-STARRS 1 | · | 1.0 km | MPC · JPL |
| 884538 | 2017 RQ_{112} | — | September 1, 2017 | Mount Lemmon | Mount Lemmon Survey | H | 500 m | MPC · JPL |
| 884539 | 2017 RH_{114} | — | September 1, 2017 | Haleakala | Pan-STARRS 1 | H | 490 m | MPC · JPL |
| 884540 | 2017 RY_{114} | — | September 2, 2017 | Haleakala | Pan-STARRS 1 | TIR | 1.6 km | MPC · JPL |
| 884541 | 2017 RG_{115} | — | September 1, 2017 | Haleakala | Pan-STARRS 1 | PHO | 640 m | MPC · JPL |
| 884542 | 2017 RD_{116} | — | September 6, 2017 | Haleakala | Pan-STARRS 1 | · | 1.1 km | MPC · JPL |
| 884543 | 2017 RU_{117} | — | September 12, 2017 | Haleakala | Pan-STARRS 1 | · | 2.8 km | MPC · JPL |
| 884544 | 2017 RP_{118} | — | September 2, 2017 | Mount Lemmon | Mount Lemmon Survey | · | 1.8 km | MPC · JPL |
| 884545 | 2017 RR_{119} | — | September 3, 2017 | Haleakala | Pan-STARRS 1 | · | 930 m | MPC · JPL |
| 884546 | 2017 RE_{121} | — | September 14, 2017 | Haleakala | Pan-STARRS 1 | · | 780 m | MPC · JPL |
| 884547 | 2017 RC_{122} | — | September 1, 2017 | Mount Lemmon | Mount Lemmon Survey | · | 3.3 km | MPC · JPL |
| 884548 | 2017 RK_{123} | — | September 1, 2017 | Haleakala | Pan-STARRS 1 | MAR | 790 m | MPC · JPL |
| 884549 | 2017 RR_{123} | — | September 1, 2017 | Haleakala | Pan-STARRS 1 | · | 790 m | MPC · JPL |
| 884550 | 2017 RF_{125} | — | September 13, 2017 | Haleakala | Pan-STARRS 1 | EUN | 900 m | MPC · JPL |
| 884551 | 2017 RA_{129} | — | April 18, 2015 | Cerro Tololo | DECam | · | 2.5 km | MPC · JPL |
| 884552 | 2017 RS_{129} | — | September 2, 2017 | Haleakala | Pan-STARRS 1 | MAR | 550 m | MPC · JPL |
| 884553 | 2017 RV_{135} | — | March 29, 2016 | Cerro Tololo-DECam | DECam | · | 730 m | MPC · JPL |
| 884554 | 2017 RL_{137} | — | September 2, 2017 | Haleakala | Pan-STARRS 1 | · | 840 m | MPC · JPL |
| 884555 | 2017 RU_{137} | — | September 1, 2017 | Mount Lemmon | Mount Lemmon Survey | critical | 770 m | MPC · JPL |
| 884556 | 2017 RP_{139} | — | September 1, 2017 | Haleakala | Pan-STARRS 1 | · | 1.0 km | MPC · JPL |
| 884557 | 2017 RL_{145} | — | September 12, 2017 | Haleakala | Pan-STARRS 1 | · | 1.7 km | MPC · JPL |
| 884558 | 2017 RF_{165} | — | September 1, 2017 | Mount Lemmon | Mount Lemmon Survey | · | 3.0 km | MPC · JPL |
| 884559 | 2017 SA_{1} | — | November 24, 2002 | Palomar | NEAT | V | 510 m | MPC · JPL |
| 884560 | 2017 SX_{5} | — | November 20, 2006 | Kitt Peak | Spacewatch | V | 490 m | MPC · JPL |
| 884561 | 2017 SV_{9} | — | November 26, 2009 | Mount Lemmon | Mount Lemmon Survey | · | 750 m | MPC · JPL |
| 884562 | 2017 SA_{13} | — | February 12, 2011 | Mount Lemmon | Mount Lemmon Survey | H | 370 m | MPC · JPL |
| 884563 | 2017 SS_{18} | — | October 16, 2007 | Mount Lemmon | Mount Lemmon Survey | H | 320 m | MPC · JPL |
| 884564 | 2017 SH_{21} | — | January 16, 2016 | Haleakala | Pan-STARRS 1 | H | 400 m | MPC · JPL |
| 884565 | 2017 SX_{29} | — | March 6, 2016 | Haleakala | Pan-STARRS 1 | H | 300 m | MPC · JPL |
| 884566 | 2017 SH_{30} | — | November 9, 2013 | Haleakala | Pan-STARRS 1 | (5) | 710 m | MPC · JPL |
| 884567 | 2017 SV_{34} | — | March 27, 2015 | Haleakala | Pan-STARRS 1 | T_{j} (2.99) · 3:2 | 3.7 km | MPC · JPL |
| 884568 | 2017 SU_{35} | — | September 18, 2017 | Haleakala | Pan-STARRS 1 | · | 850 m | MPC · JPL |
| 884569 | 2017 SD_{41} | — | October 4, 2007 | Mount Lemmon | Mount Lemmon Survey | · | 1.3 km | MPC · JPL |
| 884570 | 2017 SC_{55} | — | October 17, 2012 | Mount Lemmon | Mount Lemmon Survey | · | 1.5 km | MPC · JPL |
| 884571 | 2017 SU_{59} | — | October 3, 2013 | Haleakala | Pan-STARRS 1 | · | 650 m | MPC · JPL |
| 884572 | 2017 SY_{64} | — | February 15, 2015 | Haleakala | Pan-STARRS 1 | · | 720 m | MPC · JPL |
| 884573 | 2017 SR_{74} | — | August 24, 2017 | Haleakala | Pan-STARRS 1 | · | 2.1 km | MPC · JPL |
| 884574 | 2017 SN_{76} | — | November 3, 2007 | Mount Lemmon | Mount Lemmon Survey | · | 1.4 km | MPC · JPL |
| 884575 | 2017 SQ_{85} | — | September 17, 2017 | Haleakala | Pan-STARRS 1 | · | 2.1 km | MPC · JPL |
| 884576 | 2017 SP_{87} | — | April 1, 2016 | Haleakala | Pan-STARRS 1 | · | 710 m | MPC · JPL |
| 884577 | 2017 SG_{89} | — | August 31, 2017 | Haleakala | Pan-STARRS 1 | · | 740 m | MPC · JPL |
| 884578 | 2017 SY_{91} | — | January 20, 2015 | Haleakala | Pan-STARRS 1 | V | 410 m | MPC · JPL |
| 884579 | 2017 SF_{93} | — | November 1, 2005 | Mount Lemmon | Mount Lemmon Survey | · | 820 m | MPC · JPL |
| 884580 | 2017 SG_{93} | — | April 27, 2012 | Haleakala | Pan-STARRS 1 | · | 980 m | MPC · JPL |
| 884581 | 2017 SG_{96} | — | August 22, 2017 | Haleakala | Pan-STARRS 1 | critical | 680 m | MPC · JPL |
| 884582 | 2017 SG_{106} | — | October 5, 2013 | Haleakala | Pan-STARRS 1 | · | 710 m | MPC · JPL |
| 884583 | 2017 SR_{108} | — | September 7, 2008 | Mount Lemmon | Mount Lemmon Survey | · | 1.3 km | MPC · JPL |
| 884584 | 2017 SE_{122} | — | July 1, 2013 | Haleakala | Pan-STARRS 1 | MAS | 490 m | MPC · JPL |
| 884585 | 2017 SW_{122} | — | August 13, 2013 | Kitt Peak | Spacewatch | NYS | 930 m | MPC · JPL |
| 884586 | 2017 SU_{125} | — | September 26, 2017 | Haleakala | Pan-STARRS 1 | · | 650 m | MPC · JPL |
| 884587 | 2017 SV_{125} | — | November 10, 2013 | Mount Lemmon | Mount Lemmon Survey | (5) | 740 m | MPC · JPL |
| 884588 | 2017 SO_{127} | — | September 26, 2017 | Haleakala | Pan-STARRS 1 | H | 340 m | MPC · JPL |
| 884589 | 2017 SV_{132} | — | September 23, 2017 | Haleakala | Pan-STARRS 1 | · | 730 m | MPC · JPL |
| 884590 | 2017 SE_{133} | — | September 16, 2017 | Haleakala | Pan-STARRS 1 | · | 1.4 km | MPC · JPL |
| 884591 | 2017 SK_{133} | — | September 24, 2017 | Haleakala | Pan-STARRS 1 | EUN | 860 m | MPC · JPL |
| 884592 | 2017 SF_{136} | — | September 22, 2017 | Haleakala | Pan-STARRS 1 | · | 540 m | MPC · JPL |
| 884593 | 2017 SN_{139} | — | September 30, 2017 | Haleakala | Pan-STARRS 1 | critical | 730 m | MPC · JPL |
| 884594 | 2017 SG_{140} | — | September 19, 2017 | Haleakala | Pan-STARRS 1 | · | 1.0 km | MPC · JPL |
| 884595 | 2017 SU_{140} | — | September 30, 2013 | Catalina | CSS | · | 880 m | MPC · JPL |
| 884596 | 2017 SA_{141} | — | September 29, 2017 | Haleakala | Pan-STARRS 1 | critical | 510 m | MPC · JPL |
| 884597 | 2017 SE_{142} | — | September 26, 2017 | Haleakala | Pan-STARRS 1 | · | 1.0 km | MPC · JPL |
| 884598 | 2017 SL_{143} | — | September 19, 2017 | Haleakala | Pan-STARRS 1 | · | 1.1 km | MPC · JPL |
| 884599 | 2017 SU_{144} | — | September 30, 2017 | Haleakala | ATLAS | · | 870 m | MPC · JPL |
| 884600 | 2017 SY_{147} | — | September 21, 2017 | Haleakala | Pan-STARRS 1 | · | 700 m | MPC · JPL |

== 884601–884700 ==
back to top

| Designation | | | Discovery | | | Properties | | Ref |
| Permanent | Provisional | Named after | Date | Site | Discoverer(s) | Category | Diam. | Ref |
|---|---|---|---|---|---|---|---|---|
| 884601 | 2017 SK_{148} | — | September 24, 2017 | Haleakala | Pan-STARRS 1 | · | 530 m | MPC · JPL |
| 884602 | 2017 SG_{149} | — | September 30, 2017 | Haleakala | Pan-STARRS 1 | · | 640 m | MPC · JPL |
| 884603 | 2017 SU_{150} | — | September 23, 2017 | Haleakala | Pan-STARRS 1 | · | 470 m | MPC · JPL |
| 884604 | 2017 SX_{150} | — | September 24, 2017 | Haleakala | Pan-STARRS 1 | · | 800 m | MPC · JPL |
| 884605 | 2017 SS_{152} | — | September 24, 2017 | Haleakala | Pan-STARRS 1 | · | 860 m | MPC · JPL |
| 884606 | 2017 SA_{155} | — | September 24, 2017 | Haleakala | Pan-STARRS 1 | BRG | 900 m | MPC · JPL |
| 884607 | 2017 SL_{155} | — | September 28, 2017 | Haleakala | Pan-STARRS 1 | URS | 1.8 km | MPC · JPL |
| 884608 | 2017 SH_{162} | — | September 24, 2017 | Haleakala | Pan-STARRS 1 | KON | 1.5 km | MPC · JPL |
| 884609 | 2017 SP_{164} | — | September 19, 2017 | Haleakala | Pan-STARRS 1 | · | 730 m | MPC · JPL |
| 884610 | 2017 SG_{165} | — | September 30, 2017 | Haleakala | Pan-STARRS 1 | EUN | 830 m | MPC · JPL |
| 884611 | 2017 SS_{165} | — | September 24, 2017 | Haleakala | Pan-STARRS 1 | · | 680 m | MPC · JPL |
| 884612 | 2017 SX_{170} | — | September 30, 2017 | Mount Lemmon | Mount Lemmon Survey | · | 1.8 km | MPC · JPL |
| 884613 | 2017 SH_{171} | — | September 22, 2017 | Haleakala | Pan-STARRS 1 | · | 840 m | MPC · JPL |
| 884614 | 2017 SO_{172} | — | September 24, 2017 | Haleakala | Pan-STARRS 1 | critical | 590 m | MPC · JPL |
| 884615 | 2017 SQ_{175} | — | September 27, 2017 | Haleakala | Pan-STARRS 1 | · | 460 m | MPC · JPL |
| 884616 | 2017 ST_{175} | — | September 16, 2017 | Haleakala | Pan-STARRS 1 | · | 760 m | MPC · JPL |
| 884617 | 2017 SA_{180} | — | September 17, 2017 | Haleakala | Pan-STARRS 1 | H | 380 m | MPC · JPL |
| 884618 | 2017 ST_{180} | — | September 24, 2017 | Haleakala | Pan-STARRS 1 | (194) | 660 m | MPC · JPL |
| 884619 | 2017 ST_{182} | — | September 29, 2017 | Haleakala | Pan-STARRS 1 | EUN | 730 m | MPC · JPL |
| 884620 | 2017 SR_{184} | — | September 24, 2017 | Haleakala | Pan-STARRS 1 | EUN | 630 m | MPC · JPL |
| 884621 | 2017 SM_{185} | — | September 30, 2017 | Haleakala | Pan-STARRS 1 | (194) | 790 m | MPC · JPL |
| 884622 | 2017 SD_{188} | — | September 21, 2017 | Haleakala | Pan-STARRS 1 | EUN | 810 m | MPC · JPL |
| 884623 | 2017 SM_{190} | — | September 18, 2017 | Haleakala | Pan-STARRS 1 | T_{j} (2.99) · 3:2 · (6124) | 3.7 km | MPC · JPL |
| 884624 | 2017 SC_{191} | — | September 24, 2017 | Haleakala | Pan-STARRS 1 | · | 660 m | MPC · JPL |
| 884625 | 2017 SF_{196} | — | September 25, 2017 | Haleakala | Pan-STARRS 1 | · | 1.8 km | MPC · JPL |
| 884626 | 2017 SQ_{197} | — | September 28, 2017 | Haleakala | Pan-STARRS 1 | · | 2.1 km | MPC · JPL |
| 884627 | 2017 SO_{205} | — | September 24, 2017 | Mount Lemmon | Mount Lemmon Survey | · | 1.6 km | MPC · JPL |
| 884628 | 2017 SK_{209} | — | September 22, 2017 | Haleakala | Pan-STARRS 1 | · | 700 m | MPC · JPL |
| 884629 | 2017 SY_{212} | — | September 16, 2017 | Oukaïmeden | C. Rinner | V | 440 m | MPC · JPL |
| 884630 | 2017 SN_{213} | — | September 30, 2017 | Mount Lemmon | Mount Lemmon Survey | · | 1.9 km | MPC · JPL |
| 884631 | 2017 SY_{220} | — | September 30, 2017 | Mount Lemmon | Mount Lemmon Survey | · | 1.2 km | MPC · JPL |
| 884632 | 2017 SU_{225} | — | September 30, 2017 | Haleakala | Pan-STARRS 1 | MAR | 730 m | MPC · JPL |
| 884633 | 2017 SD_{236} | — | September 19, 2017 | Haleakala | Pan-STARRS 1 | · | 690 m | MPC · JPL |
| 884634 | 2017 SH_{237} | — | September 30, 2017 | Haleakala | Pan-STARRS 1 | KON | 1.4 km | MPC · JPL |
| 884635 | 2017 SN_{237} | — | September 23, 2017 | Haleakala | Pan-STARRS 1 | · | 760 m | MPC · JPL |
| 884636 | 2017 SO_{239} | — | September 17, 2017 | Haleakala | Pan-STARRS 1 | · | 800 m | MPC · JPL |
| 884637 | 2017 SQ_{241} | — | September 22, 2017 | Haleakala | Pan-STARRS 1 | 3:2 | 4.3 km | MPC · JPL |
| 884638 | 2017 SF_{243} | — | September 25, 2017 | Haleakala | Pan-STARRS 1 | · | 1.5 km | MPC · JPL |
| 884639 | 2017 SN_{243} | — | September 21, 2017 | Haleakala | Pan-STARRS 1 | · | 620 m | MPC · JPL |
| 884640 | 2017 SR_{249} | — | September 27, 2017 | Haleakala | Pan-STARRS 1 | · | 1.4 km | MPC · JPL |
| 884641 | 2017 SY_{251} | — | April 18, 2015 | Cerro Tololo | DECam | · | 520 m | MPC · JPL |
| 884642 | 2017 SL_{267} | — | September 19, 2017 | Haleakala | Pan-STARRS 1 | · | 780 m | MPC · JPL |
| 884643 | 2017 SW_{272} | — | September 26, 2017 | Mount Lemmon | Mount Lemmon Survey | · | 770 m | MPC · JPL |
| 884644 | 2017 SS_{273} | — | September 24, 2017 | Mount Lemmon | Mount Lemmon Survey | · | 490 m | MPC · JPL |
| 884645 | 2017 SG_{276} | — | September 30, 2017 | Mount Lemmon | Mount Lemmon Survey | · | 620 m | MPC · JPL |
| 884646 | 2017 ST_{278} | — | March 29, 2016 | Cerro Tololo-DECam | DECam | · | 710 m | MPC · JPL |
| 884647 | 2017 SB_{279} | — | September 24, 2017 | Mount Lemmon | Mount Lemmon Survey | EUN | 700 m | MPC · JPL |
| 884648 | 2017 SC_{280} | — | September 30, 2017 | Mount Lemmon | Mount Lemmon Survey | · | 750 m | MPC · JPL |
| 884649 | 2017 SM_{280} | — | October 15, 2009 | Mount Lemmon | Mount Lemmon Survey | · | 460 m | MPC · JPL |
| 884650 | 2017 SR_{280} | — | September 30, 2017 | Haleakala | Pan-STARRS 1 | · | 660 m | MPC · JPL |
| 884651 | 2017 SZ_{281} | — | September 24, 2017 | Haleakala | Pan-STARRS 1 | critical | 660 m | MPC · JPL |
| 884652 | 2017 SK_{282} | — | September 30, 2017 | Haleakala | Pan-STARRS 1 | PHO | 1.1 km | MPC · JPL |
| 884653 | 2017 SZ_{282} | — | September 26, 2017 | Haleakala | Pan-STARRS 1 | MAR | 510 m | MPC · JPL |
| 884654 | 2017 SU_{283} | — | September 26, 2017 | Haleakala | Pan-STARRS 1 | · | 620 m | MPC · JPL |
| 884655 | 2017 SZ_{284} | — | September 19, 2017 | Haleakala | Pan-STARRS 1 | · | 650 m | MPC · JPL |
| 884656 | 2017 SA_{286} | — | September 19, 2017 | Haleakala | Pan-STARRS 1 | · | 640 m | MPC · JPL |
| 884657 | 2017 SH_{287} | — | September 24, 2017 | Haleakala | Pan-STARRS 1 | critical | 630 m | MPC · JPL |
| 884658 | 2017 SF_{327} | — | September 18, 2017 | Kitt Peak | Spacewatch | · | 1.3 km | MPC · JPL |
| 884659 | 2017 SZ_{327} | — | September 26, 2017 | Haleakala | Pan-STARRS 1 | · | 1.5 km | MPC · JPL |
| 884660 | 2017 SS_{355} | — | October 24, 2011 | Mount Lemmon | Mount Lemmon Survey | · | 2.9 km | MPC · JPL |
| 884661 | 2017 SZ_{363} | — | September 16, 2017 | Haleakala | Pan-STARRS 1 | · | 1.7 km | MPC · JPL |
| 884662 | 2017 SB_{377} | — | September 16, 2017 | Haleakala | Pan-STARRS 1 | H | 420 m | MPC · JPL |
| 884663 | 2017 TN_{5} | — | September 23, 2017 | Haleakala | Pan-STARRS 1 | · | 1.3 km | MPC · JPL |
| 884664 | 2017 TN_{8} | — | July 28, 2011 | Haleakala | Pan-STARRS 1 | · | 2.4 km | MPC · JPL |
| 884665 | 2017 TF_{14} | — | October 2, 2017 | Mount Lemmon | Mount Lemmon Survey | H | 430 m | MPC · JPL |
| 884666 | 2017 TQ_{15} | — | September 22, 2017 | Xingming | Xu, Z., X. Gao | · | 2.4 km | MPC · JPL |
| 884667 | 2017 TY_{15} | — | October 11, 2017 | Mount Lemmon | Mount Lemmon Survey | · | 2.7 km | MPC · JPL |
| 884668 | 2017 TK_{16} | — | April 18, 2015 | Cerro Tololo | DECam | · | 840 m | MPC · JPL |
| 884669 | 2017 TO_{17} | — | October 3, 2017 | Haleakala | Pan-STARRS 1 | · | 740 m | MPC · JPL |
| 884670 | 2017 TW_{18} | — | October 1, 2017 | Mount Lemmon | Mount Lemmon Survey | MAR · critical | 520 m | MPC · JPL |
| 884671 | 2017 TS_{22} | — | October 16, 2013 | Mount Lemmon | Mount Lemmon Survey | MAR | 640 m | MPC · JPL |
| 884672 | 2017 TQ_{25} | — | October 14, 2017 | Mount Lemmon | Mount Lemmon Survey | · | 630 m | MPC · JPL |
| 884673 | 2017 TC_{31} | — | April 18, 2015 | Cerro Tololo | DECam | · | 720 m | MPC · JPL |
| 884674 | 2017 TP_{31} | — | October 1, 2017 | Mount Lemmon | Mount Lemmon Survey | · | 1.0 km | MPC · JPL |
| 884675 | 2017 TZ_{34} | — | October 1, 2017 | Mount Lemmon | Mount Lemmon Survey | · | 990 m | MPC · JPL |
| 884676 | 2017 TE_{39} | — | April 18, 2015 | Cerro Tololo | DECam | (194) | 760 m | MPC · JPL |
| 884677 | 2017 TC_{40} | — | October 11, 2017 | Mount Lemmon | Mount Lemmon Survey | · | 1.1 km | MPC · JPL |
| 884678 | 2017 TY_{40} | — | October 1, 2017 | Haleakala | Pan-STARRS 1 | · | 950 m | MPC · JPL |
| 884679 | 2017 TL_{42} | — | February 20, 2015 | Haleakala | Pan-STARRS 1 | · | 730 m | MPC · JPL |
| 884680 | 2017 TM_{42} | — | April 18, 2015 | Cerro Tololo | DECam | · | 670 m | MPC · JPL |
| 884681 | 2017 TC_{43} | — | October 11, 2017 | Mount Lemmon | Mount Lemmon Survey | EUN | 700 m | MPC · JPL |
| 884682 | 2017 TN_{45} | — | October 12, 2017 | Haleakala | Pan-STARRS 1 | · | 2.2 km | MPC · JPL |
| 884683 | 2017 UE_{2} | — | May 2, 2016 | Haleakala | Pan-STARRS 1 | · | 310 m | MPC · JPL |
| 884684 | 2017 UV_{3} | — | October 25, 2005 | Kitt Peak | Spacewatch | · | 700 m | MPC · JPL |
| 884685 | 2017 UU_{6} | — | November 19, 2004 | Socorro | LINEAR | · | 1.9 km | MPC · JPL |
| 884686 | 2017 UC_{9} | — | July 30, 2017 | Haleakala | Pan-STARRS 1 | · | 810 m | MPC · JPL |
| 884687 | 2017 UV_{9} | — | October 19, 2017 | GINOP-KHK, Piszkes | K. Sárneczky | · | 510 m | MPC · JPL |
| 884688 | 2017 UN_{11} | — | July 27, 2017 | Haleakala | Pan-STARRS 1 | · | 1.2 km | MPC · JPL |
| 884689 | 2017 UH_{16} | — | August 24, 2017 | Haleakala | Pan-STARRS 1 | 3:2 | 3.5 km | MPC · JPL |
| 884690 | 2017 UG_{17} | — | August 10, 2013 | Kitt Peak | Spacewatch | · | 760 m | MPC · JPL |
| 884691 | 2017 UH_{20} | — | August 8, 2012 | Haleakala | Pan-STARRS 1 | · | 1.6 km | MPC · JPL |
| 884692 | 2017 UG_{23} | — | August 31, 2013 | Haleakala | Pan-STARRS 1 | · | 760 m | MPC · JPL |
| 884693 | 2017 UU_{27} | — | September 17, 2017 | Haleakala | Pan-STARRS 1 | · | 850 m | MPC · JPL |
| 884694 | 2017 UX_{28} | — | May 1, 2016 | Cerro Tololo | DECam | NYS | 620 m | MPC · JPL |
| 884695 | 2017 UN_{31} | — | March 28, 2016 | Cerro Tololo | DECam | PHO | 540 m | MPC · JPL |
| 884696 | 2017 UF_{35} | — | October 7, 2013 | Mount Lemmon | Mount Lemmon Survey | · | 840 m | MPC · JPL |
| 884697 | 2017 UB_{36} | — | November 23, 2009 | Kitt Peak | Spacewatch | (5) | 730 m | MPC · JPL |
| 884698 | 2017 UZ_{39} | — | September 15, 2013 | Mount Lemmon | Mount Lemmon Survey | · | 700 m | MPC · JPL |
| 884699 | 2017 UP_{42} | — | November 28, 2013 | Mount Lemmon | Mount Lemmon Survey | (5) | 810 m | MPC · JPL |
| 884700 | 2017 UT_{43} | — | October 27, 2017 | Haleakala | Pan-STARRS 1 | H | 420 m | MPC · JPL |

== 884701–884800 ==
back to top

| Designation | | | Discovery | | | Properties | | Ref |
| Permanent | Provisional | Named after | Date | Site | Discoverer(s) | Category | Diam. | Ref |
|---|---|---|---|---|---|---|---|---|
| 884701 | 2017 US_{51} | — | January 11, 2016 | Haleakala | Pan-STARRS 1 | H | 470 m | MPC · JPL |
| 884702 | 2017 UJ_{53} | — | April 14, 2015 | Mount Lemmon | Mount Lemmon Survey | HNS | 690 m | MPC · JPL |
| 884703 | 2017 US_{53} | — | October 27, 2017 | Haleakala | Pan-STARRS 1 | EUN | 650 m | MPC · JPL |
| 884704 | 2017 UD_{54} | — | October 28, 2017 | Haleakala | Pan-STARRS 1 | HNS | 740 m | MPC · JPL |
| 884705 | 2017 UE_{54} | — | September 24, 2017 | Mount Lemmon | Mount Lemmon Survey | · | 1.5 km | MPC · JPL |
| 884706 | 2017 UV_{54} | — | April 23, 2014 | Cerro Tololo | DECam | T_{j} (2.91) | 2.2 km | MPC · JPL |
| 884707 | 2017 UJ_{56} | — | October 29, 2017 | Haleakala | Pan-STARRS 1 | · | 850 m | MPC · JPL |
| 884708 | 2017 UK_{56} | — | October 20, 2017 | Mount Lemmon | Mount Lemmon Survey | · | 430 m | MPC · JPL |
| 884709 | 2017 UL_{57} | — | December 30, 2013 | Mount Lemmon | Mount Lemmon Survey | · | 1.0 km | MPC · JPL |
| 884710 | 2017 UR_{57} | — | May 20, 2015 | Cerro Tololo | DECam | (5) | 790 m | MPC · JPL |
| 884711 | 2017 UU_{57} | — | October 19, 2017 | Haleakala | Pan-STARRS 1 | · | 1.3 km | MPC · JPL |
| 884712 | 2017 UM_{59} | — | April 18, 2015 | Cerro Tololo | DECam | · | 1.0 km | MPC · JPL |
| 884713 | 2017 UB_{60} | — | September 22, 2017 | Haleakala | Pan-STARRS 1 | H | 340 m | MPC · JPL |
| 884714 | 2017 UC_{60} | — | September 22, 2017 | Haleakala | Pan-STARRS 1 | · | 710 m | MPC · JPL |
| 884715 | 2017 UW_{60} | — | October 27, 2017 | Haleakala | Pan-STARRS 1 | (5) | 670 m | MPC · JPL |
| 884716 | 2017 US_{61} | — | October 30, 2017 | Haleakala | Pan-STARRS 1 | · | 910 m | MPC · JPL |
| 884717 | 2017 UP_{62} | — | October 20, 2017 | Mount Lemmon | Mount Lemmon Survey | · | 2.1 km | MPC · JPL |
| 884718 | 2017 UL_{64} | — | May 3, 2016 | Cerro Tololo | DECam | · | 750 m | MPC · JPL |
| 884719 | 2017 UM_{64} | — | October 18, 2017 | Mount Lemmon | Mount Lemmon Survey | · | 890 m | MPC · JPL |
| 884720 | 2017 UV_{65} | — | October 28, 2017 | Mount Lemmon | Mount Lemmon Survey | · | 850 m | MPC · JPL |
| 884721 | 2017 UX_{65} | — | September 22, 2017 | Haleakala | Pan-STARRS 1 | · | 950 m | MPC · JPL |
| 884722 | 2017 UP_{66} | — | October 23, 2017 | Mount Lemmon | Mount Lemmon Survey | EOS | 1.2 km | MPC · JPL |
| 884723 | 2017 UO_{67} | — | January 9, 2002 | Kitt Peak | Spacewatch | · | 740 m | MPC · JPL |
| 884724 | 2017 UV_{67} | — | October 20, 2017 | Mount Lemmon | Mount Lemmon Survey | EUN | 840 m | MPC · JPL |
| 884725 | 2017 UA_{68} | — | April 19, 2015 | Cerro Tololo | DECam | KON | 1.3 km | MPC · JPL |
| 884726 | 2017 UB_{69} | — | October 17, 2017 | Mount Lemmon | Mount Lemmon Survey | · | 690 m | MPC · JPL |
| 884727 | 2017 UL_{70} | — | October 21, 2017 | Mount Lemmon | Mount Lemmon Survey | (5) | 610 m | MPC · JPL |
| 884728 | 2017 UP_{70} | — | October 31, 2013 | Piszkés-tető | K. Sárneczky, M. Langbroek | · | 520 m | MPC · JPL |
| 884729 | 2017 UD_{72} | — | October 30, 2017 | Haleakala | Pan-STARRS 1 | · | 660 m | MPC · JPL |
| 884730 | 2017 UP_{72} | — | October 6, 2013 | Mount Lemmon | Mount Lemmon Survey | EUN · critical | 660 m | MPC · JPL |
| 884731 | 2017 UC_{73} | — | October 30, 2017 | Haleakala | Pan-STARRS 1 | · | 670 m | MPC · JPL |
| 884732 | 2017 UK_{76} | — | May 20, 2015 | Cerro Tololo | DECam | · | 830 m | MPC · JPL |
| 884733 | 2017 UG_{78} | — | October 30, 2017 | Haleakala | Pan-STARRS 1 | · | 1.8 km | MPC · JPL |
| 884734 | 2017 UK_{80} | — | April 18, 2015 | Cerro Tololo | DECam | EUN | 710 m | MPC · JPL |
| 884735 | 2017 UK_{81} | — | May 3, 2016 | Cerro Tololo | DECam | · | 770 m | MPC · JPL |
| 884736 | 2017 US_{84} | — | October 30, 2017 | Haleakala | Pan-STARRS 1 | · | 830 m | MPC · JPL |
| 884737 | 2017 UU_{86} | — | May 20, 2015 | Cerro Tololo | DECam | EUN | 840 m | MPC · JPL |
| 884738 | 2017 UW_{86} | — | October 17, 2017 | Mount Lemmon | Mount Lemmon Survey | H | 360 m | MPC · JPL |
| 884739 | 2017 UQ_{87} | — | October 27, 2017 | Haleakala | Pan-STARRS 1 | 3:2 | 3.5 km | MPC · JPL |
| 884740 | 2017 UW_{87} | — | October 28, 2017 | Haleakala | Pan-STARRS 1 | · | 1.2 km | MPC · JPL |
| 884741 | 2017 UG_{88} | — | April 18, 2015 | Cerro Tololo | DECam | EUN | 780 m | MPC · JPL |
| 884742 | 2017 UR_{88} | — | May 20, 2015 | Cerro Tololo | DECam | · | 1.2 km | MPC · JPL |
| 884743 | 2017 UZ_{90} | — | October 20, 2017 | Mount Lemmon | Mount Lemmon Survey | · | 870 m | MPC · JPL |
| 884744 | 2017 UQ_{96} | — | October 22, 2017 | Mount Lemmon | Mount Lemmon Survey | · | 1.4 km | MPC · JPL |
| 884745 | 2017 UK_{99} | — | October 20, 2017 | Mount Lemmon | Mount Lemmon Survey | · | 500 m | MPC · JPL |
| 884746 | 2017 UR_{99} | — | October 18, 2017 | Mount Lemmon | Mount Lemmon Survey | · | 1.5 km | MPC · JPL |
| 884747 | 2017 UP_{103} | — | October 23, 2017 | Mount Lemmon | Mount Lemmon Survey | MAR | 600 m | MPC · JPL |
| 884748 | 2017 UL_{104} | — | January 11, 2002 | Kitt Peak | Spacewatch | · | 800 m | MPC · JPL |
| 884749 | 2017 UE_{105} | — | October 30, 2017 | Haleakala | Pan-STARRS 1 | · | 820 m | MPC · JPL |
| 884750 | 2017 UM_{109} | — | October 21, 2017 | Mount Lemmon | Mount Lemmon Survey | · | 1.1 km | MPC · JPL |
| 884751 | 2017 UE_{110} | — | October 20, 2017 | Mount Lemmon | Mount Lemmon Survey | EUN | 690 m | MPC · JPL |
| 884752 | 2017 UD_{111} | — | April 24, 2014 | Cerro Tololo | DECam | · | 1.9 km | MPC · JPL |
| 884753 | 2017 UD_{115} | — | October 30, 2017 | Haleakala | Pan-STARRS 1 | · | 720 m | MPC · JPL |
| 884754 | 2017 UO_{116} | — | October 30, 2017 | Haleakala | Pan-STARRS 1 | · | 810 m | MPC · JPL |
| 884755 | 2017 UU_{119} | — | October 30, 2017 | Haleakala | Pan-STARRS 1 | · | 1.0 km | MPC · JPL |
| 884756 | 2017 UH_{120} | — | September 26, 2017 | Haleakala | Pan-STARRS 1 | · | 1.0 km | MPC · JPL |
| 884757 | 2017 UQ_{122} | — | October 25, 2017 | Mount Lemmon | Mount Lemmon Survey | · | 790 m | MPC · JPL |
| 884758 | 2017 UP_{123} | — | October 30, 2017 | Haleakala | Pan-STARRS 1 | 3:2 · SHU | 3.8 km | MPC · JPL |
| 884759 Compostela | 2017 UV_{125} | Compostela | October 21, 2017 | Baldone | K. Černis, I. Eglītis | · | 580 m | MPC · JPL |
| 884760 | 2017 UR_{128} | — | April 18, 2015 | Cerro Tololo | DECam | · | 1.7 km | MPC · JPL |
| 884761 | 2017 UA_{129} | — | October 17, 2017 | Mount Lemmon | Mount Lemmon Survey | · | 760 m | MPC · JPL |
| 884762 | 2017 UO_{129} | — | October 28, 2017 | Mount Lemmon | Mount Lemmon Survey | · | 790 m | MPC · JPL |
| 884763 | 2017 UJ_{131} | — | October 27, 2017 | Haleakala | Pan-STARRS 1 | (5) | 860 m | MPC · JPL |
| 884764 | 2017 UM_{131} | — | October 27, 2017 | Haleakala | Pan-STARRS 1 | · | 660 m | MPC · JPL |
| 884765 | 2017 UH_{132} | — | April 18, 2015 | Cerro Tololo | DECam | · | 1.3 km | MPC · JPL |
| 884766 | 2017 UK_{140} | — | April 18, 2015 | Cerro Tololo | DECam | EOS | 1.3 km | MPC · JPL |
| 884767 | 2017 UX_{143} | — | October 29, 2017 | Mount Lemmon | Mount Lemmon Survey | · | 1.2 km | MPC · JPL |
| 884768 | 2017 UP_{147} | — | October 30, 2017 | Haleakala | Pan-STARRS 1 | (5) | 550 m | MPC · JPL |
| 884769 | 2017 UE_{155} | — | October 28, 2017 | Haleakala | Pan-STARRS 1 | · | 1.0 km | MPC · JPL |
| 884770 | 2017 UC_{157} | — | October 28, 2017 | Mount Lemmon | Mount Lemmon Survey | · | 780 m | MPC · JPL |
| 884771 | 2017 UC_{160} | — | October 29, 2017 | Haleakala | Pan-STARRS 1 | · | 630 m | MPC · JPL |
| 884772 | 2017 UW_{162} | — | October 29, 2017 | Haleakala | Pan-STARRS 1 | · | 1.1 km | MPC · JPL |
| 884773 | 2017 UQ_{163} | — | October 30, 2017 | Haleakala | Pan-STARRS 1 | (5) | 690 m | MPC · JPL |
| 884774 | 2017 UT_{163} | — | January 17, 2015 | Haleakala | Pan-STARRS 1 | · | 1.1 km | MPC · JPL |
| 884775 | 2017 UA_{164} | — | October 28, 2017 | Mount Lemmon | Mount Lemmon Survey | · | 940 m | MPC · JPL |
| 884776 | 2017 UH_{164} | — | April 18, 2015 | Cerro Tololo | DECam | · | 840 m | MPC · JPL |
| 884777 | 2017 UO_{165} | — | October 28, 2017 | Haleakala | Pan-STARRS 1 | · | 630 m | MPC · JPL |
| 884778 | 2017 UN_{166} | — | October 28, 2017 | Mount Lemmon | Mount Lemmon Survey | · | 860 m | MPC · JPL |
| 884779 | 2017 UT_{172} | — | April 18, 2015 | Cerro Tololo | DECam | · | 740 m | MPC · JPL |
| 884780 | 2017 UX_{193} | — | October 30, 2017 | Mount Lemmon | Mount Lemmon Survey | · | 1.5 km | MPC · JPL |
| 884781 | 2017 UB_{202} | — | April 23, 2015 | Haleakala | Pan-STARRS 1 | EOS | 1.1 km | MPC · JPL |
| 884782 | 2017 VK | — | June 29, 2017 | Mount Lemmon | Mount Lemmon Survey | · | 1.3 km | MPC · JPL |
| 884783 | 2017 VR | — | October 26, 2017 | Mount Lemmon | Mount Lemmon Survey | H | 380 m | MPC · JPL |
| 884784 | 2017 VQ_{1} | — | September 28, 2013 | Mount Lemmon | Mount Lemmon Survey | · | 470 m | MPC · JPL |
| 884785 | 2017 VW_{1} | — | November 9, 2017 | Mount Lemmon | Mount Lemmon Survey | APO | 270 m | MPC · JPL |
| 884786 | 2017 VG_{2} | — | November 13, 2012 | Mount Lemmon | Mount Lemmon Survey | H | 430 m | MPC · JPL |
| 884787 | 2017 VF_{6} | — | July 13, 2013 | Haleakala | Pan-STARRS 1 | · | 770 m | MPC · JPL |
| 884788 | 2017 VJ_{6} | — | August 3, 2017 | Haleakala | Pan-STARRS 1 | · | 630 m | MPC · JPL |
| 884789 | 2017 VL_{9} | — | November 10, 2017 | Kitt Peak | Spacewatch | · | 1.2 km | MPC · JPL |
| 884790 | 2017 VY_{9} | — | February 16, 2015 | Haleakala | Pan-STARRS 1 | · | 1.0 km | MPC · JPL |
| 884791 | 2017 VG_{11} | — | August 31, 2017 | Haleakala | Pan-STARRS 1 | · | 750 m | MPC · JPL |
| 884792 | 2017 VA_{12} | — | December 24, 2013 | Mount Lemmon | Mount Lemmon Survey | · | 740 m | MPC · JPL |
| 884793 | 2017 VR_{12} | — | November 10, 2017 | Haleakala | Pan-STARRS 1 | AMO · APO · PHA · fast | 270 m | MPC · JPL |
| 884794 | 2017 VY_{12} | — | March 16, 2016 | Haleakala | Pan-STARRS 1 | H | 400 m | MPC · JPL |
| 884795 | 2017 VP_{15} | — | October 12, 2013 | Kislovodsk | ISON-Kislovodsk Observatory | EUN | 840 m | MPC · JPL |
| 884796 | 2017 VS_{20} | — | October 23, 2009 | Mount Lemmon | Mount Lemmon Survey | · | 640 m | MPC · JPL |
| 884797 | 2017 VJ_{22} | — | October 21, 2017 | Mount Lemmon | Mount Lemmon Survey | · | 490 m | MPC · JPL |
| 884798 | 2017 VM_{28} | — | October 22, 2017 | Mount Lemmon | Mount Lemmon Survey | · | 980 m | MPC · JPL |
| 884799 | 2017 VN_{28} | — | September 23, 2017 | Haleakala | Pan-STARRS 1 | EUN | 700 m | MPC · JPL |
| 884800 | 2017 VL_{33} | — | January 26, 2006 | Mount Lemmon | Mount Lemmon Survey | · | 860 m | MPC · JPL |

== 884801–884900 ==
back to top

| Designation | | | Discovery | | | Properties | | Ref |
| Permanent | Provisional | Named after | Date | Site | Discoverer(s) | Category | Diam. | Ref |
|---|---|---|---|---|---|---|---|---|
| 884801 | 2017 VZ_{34} | — | November 10, 2017 | Haleakala | Pan-STARRS 1 | H | 390 m | MPC · JPL |
| 884802 | 2017 VS_{35} | — | November 15, 2017 | Mount Lemmon | Mount Lemmon Survey | · | 470 m | MPC · JPL |
| 884803 | 2017 VB_{36} | — | November 13, 2017 | Haleakala | Pan-STARRS 1 | · | 860 m | MPC · JPL |
| 884804 | 2017 VC_{36} | — | November 9, 2017 | Haleakala | Pan-STARRS 1 | · | 740 m | MPC · JPL |
| 884805 | 2017 VH_{36} | — | November 9, 2017 | Haleakala | Pan-STARRS 1 | · | 960 m | MPC · JPL |
| 884806 | 2017 VK_{36} | — | February 15, 2010 | Mount Lemmon | Mount Lemmon Survey | · | 1.5 km | MPC · JPL |
| 884807 | 2017 VM_{36} | — | November 10, 2017 | Cerro Paranal | Gaia Ground Based Optical Tracking | · | 740 m | MPC · JPL |
| 884808 | 2017 VH_{38} | — | November 28, 2013 | Mount Lemmon | Mount Lemmon Survey | · | 680 m | MPC · JPL |
| 884809 | 2017 VM_{39} | — | April 18, 2015 | Cerro Tololo | DECam | · | 1.1 km | MPC · JPL |
| 884810 | 2017 VR_{39} | — | March 24, 2015 | Kitt Peak | Spacewatch | · | 650 m | MPC · JPL |
| 884811 | 2017 VW_{39} | — | November 10, 2017 | Mount Lemmon | Mount Lemmon Survey | H | 410 m | MPC · JPL |
| 884812 | 2017 VS_{40} | — | November 15, 2017 | Mount Lemmon | Mount Lemmon Survey | KON | 1.4 km | MPC · JPL |
| 884813 | 2017 VV_{40} | — | November 9, 2017 | Haleakala | Pan-STARRS 1 | · | 2.3 km | MPC · JPL |
| 884814 | 2017 VE_{46} | — | November 12, 2017 | Mount Lemmon | Mount Lemmon Survey | HNS | 770 m | MPC · JPL |
| 884815 | 2017 VT_{49} | — | November 15, 2017 | Mount Lemmon | Mount Lemmon Survey | · | 730 m | MPC · JPL |
| 884816 | 2017 VY_{49} | — | November 14, 2017 | Mount Lemmon | Mount Lemmon Survey | · | 880 m | MPC · JPL |
| 884817 | 2017 VY_{53} | — | November 10, 2017 | Haleakala | Pan-STARRS 1 | · | 820 m | MPC · JPL |
| 884818 | 2017 VC_{57} | — | November 15, 2017 | Mount Lemmon | Mount Lemmon Survey | · | 720 m | MPC · JPL |
| 884819 | 2017 VS_{57} | — | November 14, 2017 | Mount Lemmon | Mount Lemmon Survey | EUN | 840 m | MPC · JPL |
| 884820 | 2017 WY_{1} | — | October 28, 2017 | Haleakala | Pan-STARRS 1 | H | 410 m | MPC · JPL |
| 884821 | 2017 WA_{2} | — | October 30, 2017 | Haleakala | Pan-STARRS 1 | H | 490 m | MPC · JPL |
| 884822 | 2017 WL_{3} | — | October 30, 2010 | Mount Lemmon | Mount Lemmon Survey | · | 420 m | MPC · JPL |
| 884823 | 2017 WC_{4} | — | January 12, 2010 | Mount Lemmon | Mount Lemmon Survey | (5) | 910 m | MPC · JPL |
| 884824 | 2017 WH_{4} | — | March 16, 2016 | Haleakala | Pan-STARRS 1 | H | 370 m | MPC · JPL |
| 884825 | 2017 WG_{7} | — | September 22, 2017 | Haleakala | Pan-STARRS 1 | · | 1.3 km | MPC · JPL |
| 884826 | 2017 WM_{8} | — | September 24, 2017 | Mount Lemmon | Mount Lemmon Survey | · | 1.1 km | MPC · JPL |
| 884827 | 2017 WX_{10} | — | December 7, 2013 | Haleakala | Pan-STARRS 1 | · | 850 m | MPC · JPL |
| 884828 | 2017 WB_{12} | — | November 21, 2017 | Mount Lemmon | Mount Lemmon Survey | H | 470 m | MPC · JPL |
| 884829 | 2017 WK_{13} | — | November 19, 2017 | Mount Lemmon | Mount Lemmon Survey | APO | 440 m | MPC · JPL |
| 884830 | 2017 WT_{14} | — | January 2, 2009 | Mount Lemmon | Mount Lemmon Survey | BAR | 960 m | MPC · JPL |
| 884831 | 2017 WW_{15} | — | October 29, 2017 | Haleakala | Pan-STARRS 1 | · | 220 m | MPC · JPL |
| 884832 | 2017 WD_{18} | — | November 26, 2013 | Mount Lemmon | Mount Lemmon Survey | (5) | 640 m | MPC · JPL |
| 884833 | 2017 WZ_{19} | — | September 24, 2017 | Haleakala | Pan-STARRS 1 | · | 1.1 km | MPC · JPL |
| 884834 | 2017 WG_{20} | — | November 1, 2013 | Kitt Peak | Spacewatch | (5) | 880 m | MPC · JPL |
| 884835 | 2017 WO_{20} | — | November 14, 2017 | Mount Lemmon | Mount Lemmon Survey | · | 740 m | MPC · JPL |
| 884836 | 2017 WS_{23} | — | September 22, 2017 | Haleakala | Pan-STARRS 1 | · | 850 m | MPC · JPL |
| 884837 | 2017 WA_{24} | — | December 14, 2001 | Socorro | LINEAR | H | 400 m | MPC · JPL |
| 884838 | 2017 WH_{24} | — | October 21, 2017 | Mount Lemmon | Mount Lemmon Survey | H | 300 m | MPC · JPL |
| 884839 | 2017 WW_{24} | — | December 21, 2012 | Mount Lemmon | Mount Lemmon Survey | · | 2.4 km | MPC · JPL |
| 884840 | 2017 WM_{28} | — | January 18, 2014 | Haleakala | Pan-STARRS 1 | · | 1.3 km | MPC · JPL |
| 884841 | 2017 WB_{29} | — | December 3, 2008 | Catalina | CSS | · | 1.4 km | MPC · JPL |
| 884842 | 2017 WC_{29} | — | November 21, 2017 | Haleakala | Pan-STARRS 1 | APO +1km | 810 m | MPC · JPL |
| 884843 | 2017 WX_{30} | — | November 27, 2017 | Mount Lemmon | Mount Lemmon Survey | · | 1.1 km | MPC · JPL |
| 884844 | 2017 WP_{31} | — | November 21, 2017 | Haleakala | Pan-STARRS 1 | · | 1.0 km | MPC · JPL |
| 884845 | 2017 WO_{32} | — | May 20, 2015 | Cerro Tololo | DECam | · | 880 m | MPC · JPL |
| 884846 | 2017 WO_{34} | — | November 21, 2017 | Haleakala | Pan-STARRS 1 | GAL | 1.2 km | MPC · JPL |
| 884847 | 2017 WM_{35} | — | November 16, 2017 | Mount Lemmon | Mount Lemmon Survey | HNS | 840 m | MPC · JPL |
| 884848 | 2017 WS_{36} | — | April 19, 2015 | Cerro Tololo | DECam | · | 680 m | MPC · JPL |
| 884849 | 2017 WG_{39} | — | November 20, 2017 | Haleakala | Pan-STARRS 1 | · | 1.2 km | MPC · JPL |
| 884850 | 2017 WA_{40} | — | November 21, 2017 | Mount Lemmon | Mount Lemmon Survey | H | 440 m | MPC · JPL |
| 884851 | 2017 WM_{40} | — | April 18, 2015 | Cerro Tololo | DECam | · | 970 m | MPC · JPL |
| 884852 | 2017 WW_{40} | — | November 16, 2017 | Mount Lemmon | Mount Lemmon Survey | KON | 1.5 km | MPC · JPL |
| 884853 | 2017 WH_{41} | — | November 22, 2017 | Haleakala | Pan-STARRS 1 | · | 1.0 km | MPC · JPL |
| 884854 | 2017 WQ_{41} | — | November 24, 2017 | Haleakala | Pan-STARRS 1 | · | 830 m | MPC · JPL |
| 884855 | 2017 WG_{42} | — | May 21, 2015 | Cerro Tololo | DECam | · | 1.0 km | MPC · JPL |
| 884856 | 2017 WZ_{43} | — | November 16, 2017 | Mount Lemmon | Mount Lemmon Survey | (5) | 770 m | MPC · JPL |
| 884857 | 2017 WH_{44} | — | September 30, 2017 | Haleakala | Pan-STARRS 1 | · | 860 m | MPC · JPL |
| 884858 | 2017 WJ_{44} | — | November 16, 2017 | Mount Lemmon | Mount Lemmon Survey | (5) | 750 m | MPC · JPL |
| 884859 | 2017 WK_{45} | — | April 19, 2015 | Cerro Tololo | DECam | · | 650 m | MPC · JPL |
| 884860 | 2017 WF_{47} | — | November 18, 2017 | Haleakala | Pan-STARRS 1 | · | 2.0 km | MPC · JPL |
| 884861 | 2017 WL_{48} | — | November 16, 2017 | Mount Lemmon | Mount Lemmon Survey | · | 920 m | MPC · JPL |
| 884862 | 2017 WN_{49} | — | November 19, 2017 | Haleakala | Pan-STARRS 1 | · | 840 m | MPC · JPL |
| 884863 | 2017 WF_{54} | — | November 27, 2017 | Mount Lemmon | Mount Lemmon Survey | · | 820 m | MPC · JPL |
| 884864 | 2017 WP_{54} | — | November 21, 2017 | Haleakala | Pan-STARRS 1 | EOS | 1.2 km | MPC · JPL |
| 884865 | 2017 WS_{54} | — | November 21, 2017 | Haleakala | Pan-STARRS 1 | · | 810 m | MPC · JPL |
| 884866 | 2017 WB_{55} | — | November 17, 2017 | Mount Lemmon | Mount Lemmon Survey | · | 830 m | MPC · JPL |
| 884867 | 2017 WB_{56} | — | November 21, 2017 | Haleakala | Pan-STARRS 1 | · | 390 m | MPC · JPL |
| 884868 | 2017 WD_{56} | — | November 21, 2017 | Haleakala | Pan-STARRS 1 | · | 670 m | MPC · JPL |
| 884869 | 2017 WJ_{56} | — | November 21, 2017 | Haleakala | Pan-STARRS 1 | · | 710 m | MPC · JPL |
| 884870 | 2017 WK_{57} | — | April 23, 2014 | Cerro Tololo | DECam | TIR | 1.9 km | MPC · JPL |
| 884871 | 2017 WL_{57} | — | April 19, 2015 | Cerro Tololo | DECam | · | 800 m | MPC · JPL |
| 884872 | 2017 WP_{58} | — | November 21, 2017 | Mount Lemmon | Mount Lemmon Survey | · | 910 m | MPC · JPL |
| 884873 | 2017 WC_{59} | — | November 24, 2017 | Haleakala | Pan-STARRS 1 | · | 880 m | MPC · JPL |
| 884874 | 2017 WJ_{59} | — | November 18, 2017 | Haleakala | Pan-STARRS 1 | · | 860 m | MPC · JPL |
| 884875 | 2017 WY_{62} | — | November 16, 2017 | Mount Lemmon | Mount Lemmon Survey | KON | 1.7 km | MPC · JPL |
| 884876 | 2017 WD_{65} | — | September 25, 2000 | Kitt Peak | Spacewatch | · | 710 m | MPC · JPL |
| 884877 | 2017 WL_{68} | — | November 21, 2017 | Mount Lemmon | Mount Lemmon Survey | (5) | 830 m | MPC · JPL |
| 884878 | 2017 WP_{68} | — | November 28, 2017 | Mount Lemmon | Mount Lemmon Survey | (5) | 960 m | MPC · JPL |
| 884879 | 2017 WV_{69} | — | November 17, 2017 | Mount Lemmon | Mount Lemmon Survey | · | 1.2 km | MPC · JPL |
| 884880 | 2017 WJ_{71} | — | November 20, 2017 | Mount Lemmon | Mount Lemmon Survey | · | 810 m | MPC · JPL |
| 884881 | 2017 WH_{72} | — | November 20, 2017 | Mount Lemmon | Mount Lemmon Survey | · | 610 m | MPC · JPL |
| 884882 | 2017 WO_{73} | — | November 19, 2017 | Haleakala | Pan-STARRS 1 | BRG | 700 m | MPC · JPL |
| 884883 | 2017 WX_{73} | — | April 19, 2015 | Cerro Tololo | DECam | EUN | 800 m | MPC · JPL |
| 884884 | 2017 WC_{78} | — | November 27, 2017 | Mount Lemmon | Mount Lemmon Survey | · | 820 m | MPC · JPL |
| 884885 | 2017 XJ | — | March 28, 2014 | Catalina | CSS | · | 810 m | MPC · JPL |
| 884886 | 2017 XZ_{4} | — | November 27, 2013 | Haleakala | Pan-STARRS 1 | EUN | 590 m | MPC · JPL |
| 884887 | 2017 XU_{6} | — | September 24, 2017 | Haleakala | Pan-STARRS 1 | · | 560 m | MPC · JPL |
| 884888 | 2017 XG_{8} | — | November 28, 2013 | Mount Lemmon | Mount Lemmon Survey | · | 770 m | MPC · JPL |
| 884889 | 2017 XW_{12} | — | November 12, 2013 | Mount Lemmon | Mount Lemmon Survey | · | 570 m | MPC · JPL |
| 884890 | 2017 XV_{15} | — | September 26, 2013 | Catalina | CSS | · | 1.1 km | MPC · JPL |
| 884891 | 2017 XY_{16} | — | October 28, 2017 | Haleakala | Pan-STARRS 1 | EUN | 760 m | MPC · JPL |
| 884892 | 2017 XD_{19} | — | November 10, 2013 | Mount Lemmon | Mount Lemmon Survey | · | 780 m | MPC · JPL |
| 884893 | 2017 XH_{21} | — | October 8, 2013 | Mount Lemmon | Mount Lemmon Survey | · | 700 m | MPC · JPL |
| 884894 | 2017 XN_{31} | — | April 18, 2015 | Cerro Tololo | DECam | · | 660 m | MPC · JPL |
| 884895 | 2017 XQ_{31} | — | November 19, 2009 | Kitt Peak | Spacewatch | · | 740 m | MPC · JPL |
| 884896 | 2017 XJ_{34} | — | May 21, 2015 | Cerro Tololo | DECam | · | 820 m | MPC · JPL |
| 884897 | 2017 XN_{37} | — | December 8, 2017 | Haleakala | Pan-STARRS 1 | · | 380 m | MPC · JPL |
| 884898 | 2017 XC_{41} | — | November 12, 2013 | Mount Lemmon | Mount Lemmon Survey | · | 630 m | MPC · JPL |
| 884899 | 2017 XE_{43} | — | November 14, 2017 | Mount Lemmon | Mount Lemmon Survey | · | 620 m | MPC · JPL |
| 884900 | 2017 XX_{54} | — | April 30, 2011 | Kitt Peak | Spacewatch | H | 340 m | MPC · JPL |

== 884901–885000 ==
back to top

| Designation | | | Discovery | | | Properties | | Ref |
| Permanent | Provisional | Named after | Date | Site | Discoverer(s) | Category | Diam. | Ref |
|---|---|---|---|---|---|---|---|---|
| 884901 | 2017 XS_{55} | — | January 23, 2006 | Kitt Peak | Spacewatch | · | 660 m | MPC · JPL |
| 884902 | 2017 XE_{59} | — | October 17, 2017 | Mount Lemmon | Mount Lemmon Survey | · | 990 m | MPC · JPL |
| 884903 | 2017 XO_{60} | — | December 13, 2017 | Mount Lemmon | Mount Lemmon Survey | APO | 270 m | MPC · JPL |
| 884904 | 2017 XH_{62} | — | January 28, 2015 | Haleakala | Pan-STARRS 1 | AMO | 340 m | MPC · JPL |
| 884905 | 2017 XM_{63} | — | December 24, 2013 | Mount Lemmon | Mount Lemmon Survey | · | 650 m | MPC · JPL |
| 884906 | 2017 XN_{63} | — | December 13, 2017 | Haleakala | Pan-STARRS 1 | · | 690 m | MPC · JPL |
| 884907 | 2017 XR_{63} | — | December 12, 2017 | Haleakala | Pan-STARRS 1 | · | 800 m | MPC · JPL |
| 884908 | 2017 XX_{63} | — | December 13, 2017 | Mount Lemmon | Mount Lemmon Survey | · | 910 m | MPC · JPL |
| 884909 | 2017 XC_{64} | — | December 14, 2017 | Mount Lemmon | Mount Lemmon Survey | · | 1.1 km | MPC · JPL |
| 884910 | 2017 XR_{64} | — | April 21, 2006 | Kitt Peak | Spacewatch | EUN | 800 m | MPC · JPL |
| 884911 | 2017 XX_{64} | — | May 21, 2015 | Cerro Tololo | DECam | · | 760 m | MPC · JPL |
| 884912 | 2017 XA_{66} | — | December 13, 2017 | Mount Lemmon | Mount Lemmon Survey | (5) | 810 m | MPC · JPL |
| 884913 | 2017 XG_{66} | — | December 12, 2017 | Haleakala | Pan-STARRS 1 | · | 530 m | MPC · JPL |
| 884914 | 2017 XS_{67} | — | December 13, 2017 | Haleakala | Pan-STARRS 1 | · | 840 m | MPC · JPL |
| 884915 | 2017 XE_{68} | — | December 13, 2017 | Haleakala | Pan-STARRS 1 | · | 890 m | MPC · JPL |
| 884916 | 2017 XO_{69} | — | December 15, 2017 | Mount Lemmon | Mount Lemmon Survey | H | 410 m | MPC · JPL |
| 884917 | 2017 XM_{77} | — | December 15, 2017 | Mount Lemmon | Mount Lemmon Survey | · | 800 m | MPC · JPL |
| 884918 | 2017 XC_{78} | — | December 12, 2017 | Haleakala | Pan-STARRS 1 | · | 1.2 km | MPC · JPL |
| 884919 | 2017 XK_{78} | — | December 13, 2017 | Haleakala | Pan-STARRS 1 | · | 1.0 km | MPC · JPL |
| 884920 | 2017 XR_{81} | — | December 8, 2017 | Haleakala | Pan-STARRS 1 | · | 780 m | MPC · JPL |
| 884921 | 2017 XC_{82} | — | December 11, 2017 | Haleakala | Pan-STARRS 1 | · | 810 m | MPC · JPL |
| 884922 | 2017 XW_{83} | — | December 14, 2017 | Mount Lemmon | Mount Lemmon Survey | · | 670 m | MPC · JPL |
| 884923 | 2017 XX_{83} | — | December 14, 2017 | Mount Lemmon | Mount Lemmon Survey | (5) | 670 m | MPC · JPL |
| 884924 | 2017 XZ_{83} | — | April 19, 2015 | Cerro Tololo | DECam | EUN | 680 m | MPC · JPL |
| 884925 | 2017 XC_{84} | — | December 15, 2017 | Mount Lemmon | Mount Lemmon Survey | · | 890 m | MPC · JPL |
| 884926 | 2017 XG_{84} | — | December 7, 2017 | Mount Lemmon | Mount Lemmon Survey | · | 1.0 km | MPC · JPL |
| 884927 | 2017 XR_{84} | — | December 10, 2017 | Haleakala | Pan-STARRS 1 | (5) | 860 m | MPC · JPL |
| 884928 | 2017 XS_{84} | — | December 14, 2017 | Mount Lemmon | Mount Lemmon Survey | (5) | 870 m | MPC · JPL |
| 884929 | 2017 XT_{84} | — | May 20, 2015 | Cerro Tololo | DECam | EUN | 610 m | MPC · JPL |
| 884930 | 2017 XA_{85} | — | December 8, 2017 | Haleakala | Pan-STARRS 1 | · | 1.1 km | MPC · JPL |
| 884931 | 2017 XB_{85} | — | December 14, 2017 | Haleakala | Pan-STARRS 1 | HNS | 900 m | MPC · JPL |
| 884932 | 2017 XQ_{85} | — | December 14, 2017 | Mount Lemmon | Mount Lemmon Survey | (5) | 820 m | MPC · JPL |
| 884933 | 2017 XD_{87} | — | December 12, 2017 | Haleakala | Pan-STARRS 1 | · | 1.1 km | MPC · JPL |
| 884934 | 2017 XF_{87} | — | December 12, 2017 | Haleakala | Pan-STARRS 1 | · | 860 m | MPC · JPL |
| 884935 | 2017 XT_{88} | — | May 20, 2015 | Cerro Tololo | DECam | · | 900 m | MPC · JPL |
| 884936 | 2017 XV_{98} | — | December 12, 2017 | Haleakala | Pan-STARRS 1 | 3:2 · SHU | 2.8 km | MPC · JPL |
| 884937 | 2017 XX_{98} | — | December 13, 2017 | Mount Lemmon | Mount Lemmon Survey | · | 1.2 km | MPC · JPL |
| 884938 | 2017 XZ_{99} | — | December 15, 2017 | Mount Lemmon | Mount Lemmon Survey | · | 810 m | MPC · JPL |
| 884939 | 2017 YF | — | November 10, 2017 | Haleakala | Pan-STARRS 1 | H | 560 m | MPC · JPL |
| 884940 | 2017 YJ_{4} | — | December 31, 2008 | Catalina | CSS | BAR | 1.1 km | MPC · JPL |
| 884941 | 2017 YL_{7} | — | August 4, 2017 | Haleakala | Pan-STARRS 1 | · | 930 m | MPC · JPL |
| 884942 | 2017 YS_{7} | — | November 22, 2017 | Mount Lemmon | Mount Lemmon Survey | · | 1.1 km | MPC · JPL |
| 884943 | 2017 YC_{8} | — | December 28, 2017 | Mount Lemmon | Mount Lemmon Survey | APO | 500 m | MPC · JPL |
| 884944 | 2017 YL_{10} | — | October 20, 2016 | Mount Lemmon | Mount Lemmon Survey | TEL | 870 m | MPC · JPL |
| 884945 | 2017 YJ_{13} | — | October 27, 2017 | Mount Lemmon | Mount Lemmon Survey | · | 1.4 km | MPC · JPL |
| 884946 | 2017 YO_{15} | — | December 25, 2017 | Mount Lemmon | Mount Lemmon Survey | · | 1.4 km | MPC · JPL |
| 884947 | 2017 YB_{16} | — | December 26, 2017 | Mount Lemmon | Mount Lemmon Survey | HNS | 780 m | MPC · JPL |
| 884948 | 2017 YX_{16} | — | December 16, 2017 | Mount Lemmon | Mount Lemmon Survey | · | 1.1 km | MPC · JPL |
| 884949 | 2017 YG_{17} | — | December 24, 2017 | Haleakala | Pan-STARRS 1 | · | 860 m | MPC · JPL |
| 884950 | 2017 YH_{17} | — | December 15, 2017 | Mount Lemmon | Mount Lemmon Survey | · | 1.0 km | MPC · JPL |
| 884951 | 2017 YZ_{18} | — | December 16, 2017 | Mount Lemmon | Mount Lemmon Survey | critical | 1.1 km | MPC · JPL |
| 884952 | 2017 YP_{19} | — | December 28, 2017 | Mount Lemmon | Mount Lemmon Survey | EUN | 930 m | MPC · JPL |
| 884953 | 2017 YF_{21} | — | December 24, 2017 | Haleakala | Pan-STARRS 1 | · | 850 m | MPC · JPL |
| 884954 | 2017 YM_{21} | — | December 24, 2017 | Haleakala | Pan-STARRS 1 | MAR | 690 m | MPC · JPL |
| 884955 | 2017 YM_{22} | — | December 28, 2017 | Mount Lemmon | Mount Lemmon Survey | · | 1.0 km | MPC · JPL |
| 884956 | 2017 YA_{23} | — | December 24, 2017 | Haleakala | Pan-STARRS 1 | · | 980 m | MPC · JPL |
| 884957 | 2017 YG_{24} | — | December 23, 2017 | Haleakala | Pan-STARRS 1 | PHO | 750 m | MPC · JPL |
| 884958 | 2017 YO_{25} | — | December 23, 2017 | Haleakala | Pan-STARRS 1 | · | 1.3 km | MPC · JPL |
| 884959 | 2017 YT_{25} | — | December 23, 2017 | Haleakala | Pan-STARRS 1 | L5 | 5.3 km | MPC · JPL |
| 884960 | 2017 YF_{27} | — | December 24, 2017 | Mount Lemmon | Mount Lemmon Survey | EUN | 760 m | MPC · JPL |
| 884961 | 2017 YJ_{27} | — | May 4, 2014 | Catalina | CSS | · | 1.2 km | MPC · JPL |
| 884962 | 2017 YT_{27} | — | May 20, 2015 | Cerro Tololo | DECam | · | 660 m | MPC · JPL |
| 884963 | 2017 YY_{27} | — | December 22, 2017 | Haleakala | Pan-STARRS 1 | · | 960 m | MPC · JPL |
| 884964 | 2017 YJ_{28} | — | December 29, 2017 | Mount Lemmon | Mount Lemmon Survey | BAR | 1.2 km | MPC · JPL |
| 884965 | 2017 YZ_{28} | — | December 25, 2017 | Haleakala | Pan-STARRS 1 | · | 1.5 km | MPC · JPL |
| 884966 | 2017 YR_{31} | — | December 23, 2017 | Haleakala | Pan-STARRS 1 | EUN | 930 m | MPC · JPL |
| 884967 | 2017 YX_{32} | — | December 23, 2017 | Haleakala | Pan-STARRS 1 | · | 1.3 km | MPC · JPL |
| 884968 | 2017 YQ_{36} | — | December 28, 2017 | Mount Lemmon | Mount Lemmon Survey | H | 500 m | MPC · JPL |
| 884969 | 2017 YF_{37} | — | December 16, 2017 | Mount Lemmon | Mount Lemmon Survey | · | 960 m | MPC · JPL |
| 884970 | 2017 YM_{37} | — | December 28, 2017 | Mount Lemmon | Mount Lemmon Survey | PHO | 850 m | MPC · JPL |
| 884971 | 2017 YS_{37} | — | December 29, 2017 | Mount Lemmon | Mount Lemmon Survey | · | 780 m | MPC · JPL |
| 884972 | 2017 YM_{48} | — | August 9, 2016 | Haleakala | Pan-STARRS 1 | · | 1.3 km | MPC · JPL |
| 884973 | 2017 YE_{49} | — | May 24, 2015 | Haleakala | Pan-STARRS 1 | HNS | 720 m | MPC · JPL |
| 884974 | 2017 YF_{49} | — | December 25, 2017 | Mount Lemmon | Mount Lemmon Survey | · | 1.3 km | MPC · JPL |
| 884975 | 2017 YJ_{50} | — | December 23, 2017 | Haleakala | Pan-STARRS 1 | (1547) | 750 m | MPC · JPL |
| 884976 | 2017 YX_{50} | — | December 25, 2017 | Haleakala | Pan-STARRS 1 | · | 1.9 km | MPC · JPL |
| 884977 | 2017 YC_{52} | — | December 13, 2017 | Mount Lemmon | Mount Lemmon Survey | · | 820 m | MPC · JPL |
| 884978 | 2017 YE_{57} | — | December 26, 2017 | Mount Lemmon | Mount Lemmon Survey | HNS | 970 m | MPC · JPL |
| 884979 | 2017 YZ_{79} | — | December 24, 2017 | Haleakala | Pan-STARRS 1 | · | 1.1 km | MPC · JPL |
| 884980 | 2018 AC | — | January 3, 2018 | Haleakala | Pan-STARRS 1 | · | 1.2 km | MPC · JPL |
| 884981 | 2018 AL | — | November 27, 2014 | Haleakala | Pan-STARRS 1 | H | 490 m | MPC · JPL |
| 884982 | 2018 AM | — | November 19, 2013 | Haleakala | Pan-STARRS 1 | · | 800 m | MPC · JPL |
| 884983 | 2018 AP_{4} | — | December 7, 2017 | Haleakala | Pan-STARRS 1 | · | 940 m | MPC · JPL |
| 884984 | 2018 AZ_{4} | — | November 22, 2017 | Haleakala | Pan-STARRS 1 | EUN | 850 m | MPC · JPL |
| 884985 | 2018 AR_{9} | — | November 16, 2006 | Kitt Peak | Spacewatch | · | 680 m | MPC · JPL |
| 884986 | 2018 AF_{10} | — | September 27, 2016 | Haleakala | Pan-STARRS 1 | · | 1.2 km | MPC · JPL |
| 884987 | 2018 AU_{10} | — | October 18, 2012 | Haleakala | Pan-STARRS 1 | · | 930 m | MPC · JPL |
| 884988 | 2018 AQ_{12} | — | December 29, 2017 | Mount Lemmon | Mount Lemmon Survey | H | 410 m | MPC · JPL |
| 884989 | 2018 AR_{13} | — | May 21, 2015 | Cerro Tololo | DECam | EUP | 2.5 km | MPC · JPL |
| 884990 | 2018 AG_{14} | — | July 3, 2016 | Mount Lemmon | Mount Lemmon Survey | · | 1.2 km | MPC · JPL |
| 884991 | 2018 AD_{15} | — | July 14, 2016 | Haleakala | Pan-STARRS 1 | · | 1.0 km | MPC · JPL |
| 884992 | 2018 AF_{15} | — | December 14, 2017 | Mount Lemmon | Mount Lemmon Survey | · | 1.0 km | MPC · JPL |
| 884993 | 2018 AF_{18} | — | September 25, 2016 | Mount Lemmon | Mount Lemmon Survey | (5) | 810 m | MPC · JPL |
| 884994 | 2018 AF_{19} | — | January 14, 2018 | Haleakala | Pan-STARRS 1 | · | 1.1 km | MPC · JPL |
| 884995 | 2018 AO_{19} | — | January 14, 2018 | Mount Lemmon | Mount Lemmon Survey | · | 1.2 km | MPC · JPL |
| 884996 | 2018 AT_{19} | — | January 15, 2018 | Mount Lemmon | Mount Lemmon Survey | · | 1.1 km | MPC · JPL |
| 884997 | 2018 AG_{21} | — | January 15, 2018 | Mount Lemmon | Mount Lemmon Survey | MAR | 760 m | MPC · JPL |
| 884998 | 2018 AK_{21} | — | January 12, 2018 | Haleakala | Pan-STARRS 1 | · | 970 m | MPC · JPL |
| 884999 | 2018 AN_{24} | — | April 23, 2014 | Cerro Tololo | DECam | · | 1.3 km | MPC · JPL |
| 885000 | 2018 AD_{25} | — | January 12, 2018 | Mount Lemmon | Mount Lemmon Survey | · | 930 m | MPC · JPL |

back to top

== Meaning of names ==
As minor planet discoveries are confirmed, they are given a permanent number by the IAU's Minor Planet Center (MPC), and the discoverers can then submit names for them, following the IAU's naming conventions. The list below concerns those minor planets in the specified number-range that have received names, and explains the meanings of those names.

Official naming citations of newly named small Solar System bodies are approved and published in a bulletin by IAU's Working Group for Small Bodies Nomenclature (WGSBN). Before May 2021, citations were published in MPC's Minor Planet Circulars for many decades. Recent citations can also be found on the JPL Small-Body Database (SBDB). Until his death in 2016, German astronomer Lutz D. Schmadel compiled these citations into the Dictionary of Minor Planet Names (DMP) and regularly updated the collection.

Based on Paul Herget's The Names of the Minor Planets, Schmadel also researched the unclear origin of numerous asteroids, most of which had been named prior to World War II. This article incorporates text from this source, which is in the public domain: SBDB New namings may only be added to this list below after official publication as the preannouncement of names is condemned. The WGSBN publishes a comprehensive guideline for the naming rules of non-cometary small Solar System bodies.

| Named minor planet | Provisional | This minor planet was named for... | Ref · Catalog |
|---|---|---|---|
| 884759 Compostela | 2017 UV_{125} | Santiago de Compostela, the capital of Galicia in northwestern Spain. | IAU · 884759 |
