= List of minor planets: 869001–870000 =

The following is a partial list of minor planets, running from minor-planet number 869001 through 870000, inclusive. The primary data for this and other partial lists is based on JPL's "Small-Body Orbital Elements" and data available from the Minor Planet Center. Critical list information is also provided by the MPC, unless otherwise specified from Lowell Observatory. A detailed description of the table's columns and additional sources are given on the main page including a complete list of every page in this series, and a statistical break-up on the dynamical classification of minor planets.

Also see the summary list of all named bodies in numerical and alphabetical order, and the corresponding naming citations for the number range of this particular list. New namings may only be added to this list after official publication, as the preannouncement of names is condemned by the Working Group for Small Bodies Nomenclature of the International Astronomical Union.

Near-Earth obj.	MBA (inner)	MBA (outer)	Centaur
Mars-crosser	MBA (middle)	Jupiter trojan	Trans-Neptunian obj.
Unclassified

== 869001–869100 ==
Designation			Discovery			Properties		Ref
Permanent	Provisional	Named after	Date	Site	Discoverer(s)	Category	Diam.	Ref
869001	2016 LA_{52}	—	May 26, 2007	Mount Lemmon	Mount Lemmon Survey	JUN	670 m	MPC; JPL
869002	2016 LQ_{52}	—	March 11, 2013	Palomar	Palomar Transient Factory	H	380 m	MPC; JPL
869003	2016 LK_{53}	—	June 8, 2016	Haleakala	Pan-STARRS 1	H	510 m	MPC; JPL
869004	2016 LN_{53}	—	June 10, 2016	Haleakala	Pan-STARRS 1	H	480 m	MPC; JPL
869005	2016 LU_{54}	—	October 8, 2012	Haleakala	Pan-STARRS 1	·	1.3 km	MPC; JPL
869006	2016 LO_{56}	—	June 7, 2016	Haleakala	Pan-STARRS 1	·	1.6 km	MPC; JPL
869007	2016 LZ_{56}	—	March 14, 2011	Mount Lemmon	Mount Lemmon Survey	·	1.0 km	MPC; JPL
869008	2016 LD_{57}	—	June 7, 2016	Haleakala	Pan-STARRS 1	·	1.3 km	MPC; JPL
869009	2016 LB_{60}	—	April 26, 2011	Mount Lemmon	Mount Lemmon Survey	ADE	1.1 km	MPC; JPL
869010	2016 LM_{62}	—	June 7, 2016	Haleakala	Pan-STARRS 1	·	1.1 km	MPC; JPL
869011	2016 LT_{62}	—	September 4, 2011	Haleakala	Pan-STARRS 1	·	1.6 km	MPC; JPL
869012	2016 LB_{65}	—	June 2, 2016	Mount Lemmon	Mount Lemmon Survey	·	620 m	MPC; JPL
869013	2016 LA_{66}	—	June 2, 2016	Mount Lemmon	Mount Lemmon Survey	·	570 m	MPC; JPL
869014	2016 LE_{66}	—	June 2, 2016	Mount Lemmon	Mount Lemmon Survey	·	900 m	MPC; JPL
869015	2016 LU_{66}	—	June 7, 2016	Haleakala	Pan-STARRS 1	·	870 m	MPC; JPL
869016	2016 LA_{68}	—	June 7, 2016	Mount Lemmon	Mount Lemmon Survey	·	1.2 km	MPC; JPL
869017	2016 LH_{69}	—	June 7, 2016	Haleakala	Pan-STARRS 1	·	1.3 km	MPC; JPL
869018	2016 LJ_{70}	—	June 7, 2016	Haleakala	Pan-STARRS 1	·	1.1 km	MPC; JPL
869019	2016 LL_{70}	—	June 5, 2016	Mount Lemmon	Mount Lemmon Survey	·	2.1 km	MPC; JPL
869020	2016 LU_{70}	—	June 5, 2016	Haleakala	Pan-STARRS 1	·	2.4 km	MPC; JPL
869021	2016 LC_{71}	—	June 5, 2016	Haleakala	Pan-STARRS 1	·	770 m	MPC; JPL
869022	2016 LY_{71}	—	June 8, 2016	Mount Lemmon	Mount Lemmon Survey	·	1.2 km	MPC; JPL
869023	2016 LH_{72}	—	June 14, 2012	Mount Lemmon	Mount Lemmon Survey	·	910 m	MPC; JPL
869024	2016 LV_{72}	—	June 11, 2016	Mount Lemmon	Mount Lemmon Survey	EUN	710 m	MPC; JPL
869025	2016 LJ_{75}	—	June 14, 2016	Mount Lemmon	Mount Lemmon Survey	H	340 m	MPC; JPL
869026	2016 LJ_{77}	—	June 7, 2016	Haleakala	Pan-STARRS 1	EUN	790 m	MPC; JPL
869027	2016 LP_{77}	—	June 11, 2016	Mount Lemmon	Mount Lemmon Survey	·	1.2 km	MPC; JPL
869028	2016 LS_{77}	—	June 8, 2016	Haleakala	Pan-STARRS 1	·	1.1 km	MPC; JPL
869029	2016 LX_{77}	—	June 8, 2016	Haleakala	Pan-STARRS 1	·	850 m	MPC; JPL
869030	2016 LQ_{78}	—	June 7, 2016	Haleakala	Pan-STARRS 1	·	870 m	MPC; JPL
869031	2016 LW_{78}	—	June 12, 2016	Mount Lemmon	Mount Lemmon Survey	·	870 m	MPC; JPL
869032	2016 LR_{79}	—	June 2, 2016	Haleakala	Pan-STARRS 1	·	1.1 km	MPC; JPL
869033	2016 LT_{79}	—	June 7, 2016	Haleakala	Pan-STARRS 1	·	920 m	MPC; JPL
869034	2016 LB_{80}	—	June 8, 2016	Haleakala	Pan-STARRS 1	·	540 m	MPC; JPL
869035	2016 LO_{81}	—	June 7, 2016	Haleakala	Pan-STARRS 1	·	580 m	MPC; JPL
869036	2016 LG_{82}	—	June 7, 2016	Haleakala	Pan-STARRS 1	·	1.1 km	MPC; JPL
869037	2016 LA_{84}	—	June 8, 2016	Haleakala	Pan-STARRS 1	·	640 m	MPC; JPL
869038	2016 LG_{84}	—	June 8, 2016	Mount Lemmon	Mount Lemmon Survey	·	930 m	MPC; JPL
869039	2016 LC_{85}	—	June 7, 2016	Haleakala	Pan-STARRS 1	·	2.2 km	MPC; JPL
869040	2016 LK_{85}	—	June 4, 2016	Haleakala	Pan-STARRS 1	·	1.6 km	MPC; JPL
869041	2016 LX_{91}	—	June 7, 2016	Haleakala	Pan-STARRS 1	·	950 m	MPC; JPL
869042	2016 LN_{92}	—	June 3, 2016	Haleakala	Pan-STARRS 1	·	1.1 km	MPC; JPL
869043	2016 LM_{93}	—	January 16, 2015	Haleakala	Pan-STARRS 1	HNS	690 m	MPC; JPL
869044	2016 LK_{95}	—	June 10, 2016	Haleakala	Pan-STARRS 1	·	810 m	MPC; JPL
869045	2016 LN_{96}	—	June 8, 2016	Haleakala	Pan-STARRS 1	·	840 m	MPC; JPL
869046	2016 LW_{96}	—	June 7, 2016	Haleakala	Pan-STARRS 1	·	480 m	MPC; JPL
869047	2016 LW_{97}	—	June 8, 2016	Haleakala	Pan-STARRS 1	·	1.1 km	MPC; JPL
869048	2016 LZ_{97}	—	June 7, 2016	Haleakala	Pan-STARRS 1	·	1.2 km	MPC; JPL
869049	2016 LR_{109}	—	May 28, 2012	Mount Lemmon	Mount Lemmon Survey	·	970 m	MPC; JPL
869050	2016 ML	—	December 1, 2008	Mount Lemmon	Mount Lemmon Survey	BAR	1.2 km	MPC; JPL
869051	2016 MA_{1}	—	November 18, 2011	Mount Lemmon	Mount Lemmon Survey	·	2.3 km	MPC; JPL
869052	2016 MT_{2}	—	June 7, 2016	Mount Lemmon	Mount Lemmon Survey	·	2.3 km	MPC; JPL
869053	2016 ML_{3}	—	June 16, 2016	Haleakala	Pan-STARRS 1	·	1.4 km	MPC; JPL
869054	2016 MS_{4}	—	June 29, 2016	Haleakala	Pan-STARRS 1	·	1.1 km	MPC; JPL
869055	2016 MG_{5}	—	June 29, 2016	Haleakala	Pan-STARRS 1	·	1.9 km	MPC; JPL
869056	2016 MC_{6}	—	June 18, 2016	Haleakala	Pan-STARRS 1	·	1.6 km	MPC; JPL
869057	2016 MG_{6}	—	June 28, 2016	Haleakala	Pan-STARRS 1	·	790 m	MPC; JPL
869058	2016 NK	—	November 27, 2013	Haleakala	Pan-STARRS 1	·	600 m	MPC; JPL
869059	2016 NG_{1}	—	July 14, 1999	Socorro	LINEAR	·	440 m	MPC; JPL
869060	2016 NE_{4}	—	October 17, 2012	Mount Lemmon	Mount Lemmon Survey	·	1.5 km	MPC; JPL
869061	2016 NP_{6}	—	July 3, 2016	Mount Lemmon	Mount Lemmon Survey	·	1.3 km	MPC; JPL
869062	2016 NE_{11}	—	July 5, 2016	Mount Lemmon	Mount Lemmon Survey	ADE	1.2 km	MPC; JPL
869063	2016 NG_{12}	—	June 8, 2016	Haleakala	Pan-STARRS 1	·	1.0 km	MPC; JPL
869064	2016 NT_{12}	—	October 9, 2008	Catalina	CSS	·	1.4 km	MPC; JPL
869065	2016 NV_{13}	—	September 29, 2008	Catalina	CSS	·	890 m	MPC; JPL
869066	2016 NJ_{14}	—	April 18, 2015	Haleakala	Pan-STARRS 1	EUN	1.0 km	MPC; JPL
869067	2016 NL_{14}	—	October 1, 2003	Kitt Peak	Spacewatch	·	540 m	MPC; JPL
869068	2016 NK_{16}	—	October 17, 2012	Mount Lemmon	Mount Lemmon Survey	·	1.2 km	MPC; JPL
869069	2016 NE_{17}	—	September 14, 2012	Mount Lemmon	Mount Lemmon Survey	JUN	850 m	MPC; JPL
869070	2016 NY_{17}	—	July 3, 2016	Mount Lemmon	Mount Lemmon Survey	·	850 m	MPC; JPL
869071	2016 NW_{18}	—	June 8, 2016	Haleakala	Pan-STARRS 1	·	1.3 km	MPC; JPL
869072	2016 NX_{18}	—	June 8, 2016	Mount Lemmon	Mount Lemmon Survey	EUN	940 m	MPC; JPL
869073	2016 NE_{20}	—	May 2, 2016	Haleakala	Pan-STARRS 1	·	690 m	MPC; JPL
869074	2016 NF_{21}	—	July 6, 2016	Haleakala	Pan-STARRS 1	·	1.3 km	MPC; JPL
869075	2016 NU_{21}	—	July 7, 2016	Mount Lemmon	Mount Lemmon Survey	TIR	2.2 km	MPC; JPL
869076	2016 NX_{21}	—	August 16, 2012	Siding Spring	SSS	·	1.3 km	MPC; JPL
869077	2016 NM_{24}	—	June 7, 2016	Haleakala	Pan-STARRS 1	MAR	780 m	MPC; JPL
869078	2016 NC_{25}	—	July 8, 2016	Haleakala	Pan-STARRS 1	·	960 m	MPC; JPL
869079	2016 NR_{25}	—	December 7, 2013	Haleakala	Pan-STARRS 1	MAR	650 m	MPC; JPL
869080	2016 NP_{29}	—	August 12, 2012	Kitt Peak	Spacewatch	·	1.1 km	MPC; JPL
869081	2016 NB_{31}	—	July 10, 2016	Mount Lemmon	Mount Lemmon Survey	·	1.0 km	MPC; JPL
869082	2016 NM_{32}	—	July 10, 2016	Mount Lemmon	Mount Lemmon Survey	·	860 m	MPC; JPL
869083	2016 NC_{33}	—	September 17, 2009	Dauban	C. Rinner, Kugel, F.	·	590 m	MPC; JPL
869084	2016 NY_{33}	—	July 5, 2016	Mount Lemmon	Mount Lemmon Survey	·	950 m	MPC; JPL
869085	2016 ND_{34}	—	June 7, 2016	Haleakala	Pan-STARRS 1	·	1.3 km	MPC; JPL
869086	2016 NE_{35}	—	July 30, 2008	Mount Lemmon	Mount Lemmon Survey	·	890 m	MPC; JPL
869087	2016 NT_{35}	—	October 31, 2010	Mount Lemmon	Mount Lemmon Survey	·	470 m	MPC; JPL
869088	2016 NB_{36}	—	June 8, 2016	Mount Lemmon	Mount Lemmon Survey	·	790 m	MPC; JPL
869089	2016 NE_{36}	—	July 12, 2016	Mount Lemmon	Mount Lemmon Survey	·	1.5 km	MPC; JPL
869090	2016 NZ_{37}	—	September 18, 2003	Kitt Peak	Spacewatch	·	1.1 km	MPC; JPL
869091	2016 NR_{39}	—	August 26, 2005	Palomar	NEAT	NYS	890 m	MPC; JPL
869092	2016 ND_{42}	—	December 20, 2009	Mount Lemmon	Mount Lemmon Survey	H	390 m	MPC; JPL
869093	2016 NF_{43}	—	December 31, 2013	Mount Lemmon	Mount Lemmon Survey	HNS	950 m	MPC; JPL
869094	2016 NA_{44}	—	January 26, 2006	Kitt Peak	Spacewatch	·	940 m	MPC; JPL
869095	2016 NC_{45}	—	November 28, 2013	Kitt Peak	Spacewatch	·	560 m	MPC; JPL
869096	2016 NR_{45}	—	March 26, 2008	Mount Lemmon	Mount Lemmon Survey	NYS	850 m	MPC; JPL
869097	2016 NE_{46}	—	October 9, 2004	Kitt Peak	Spacewatch	(5)	750 m	MPC; JPL
869098	2016 NV_{49}	—	July 13, 2016	Mount Lemmon	Mount Lemmon Survey	·	890 m	MPC; JPL
869099	2016 NE_{50}	—	July 6, 2016	Haleakala	Pan-STARRS 1	·	990 m	MPC; JPL
869100	2016 NK_{56}	—	July 11, 2016	Mount Lemmon	Mount Lemmon Survey	PAL	830 m	MPC; JPL

== 869101–869200 ==
back to top

Designation			Discovery			Properties		Ref
Permanent	Provisional	Named after	Date	Site	Discoverer(s)	Category	Diam.	Ref
869101	2016 NZ_{56}	—	March 26, 2010	Catalina	CSS	H	570 m	MPC; JPL
869102	2016 NH_{59}	—	July 4, 2016	Haleakala	Pan-STARRS 1	·	950 m	MPC; JPL
869103	2016 NP_{59}	—	July 5, 2016	Mount Lemmon	Mount Lemmon Survey	·	1.6 km	MPC; JPL
869104	2016 NF_{60}	—	August 29, 2002	Palomar	NEAT	·	1.6 km	MPC; JPL
869105	2016 NW_{60}	—	July 7, 2016	Haleakala	Pan-STARRS 1	·	1.4 km	MPC; JPL
869106	2016 NF_{61}	—	July 7, 2016	Haleakala	Pan-STARRS 1	·	1.2 km	MPC; JPL
869107	2016 NX_{61}	—	July 9, 2016	Haleakala	Pan-STARRS 1	·	1.2 km	MPC; JPL
869108	2016 NG_{62}	—	July 11, 2016	Haleakala	Pan-STARRS 1	EUN	810 m	MPC; JPL
869109	2016 NU_{63}	—	July 4, 2016	Haleakala	Pan-STARRS 1	·	2.1 km	MPC; JPL
869110	2016 NF_{64}	—	July 13, 2016	Haleakala	Pan-STARRS 1	·	1.3 km	MPC; JPL
869111	2016 NL_{64}	—	January 6, 2008	Mauna Kea	P. A. Wiegert, A. M. Gilbert	THM	1.5 km	MPC; JPL
869112	2016 NS_{64}	—	July 14, 2016	Haleakala	Pan-STARRS 1	·	1.4 km	MPC; JPL
869113	2016 NX_{70}	—	August 25, 2012	Kitt Peak	Spacewatch	·	1.2 km	MPC; JPL
869114	2016 NC_{71}	—	August 14, 2012	Haleakala	Pan-STARRS 1	MAR	670 m	MPC; JPL
869115	2016 NH_{71}	—	July 5, 2016	Haleakala	Pan-STARRS 1	MAR	700 m	MPC; JPL
869116	2016 NY_{71}	—	September 16, 2012	Kitt Peak	Spacewatch	·	1.1 km	MPC; JPL
869117	2016 NV_{72}	—	July 5, 2016	Haleakala	Pan-STARRS 1	·	1.1 km	MPC; JPL
869118	2016 NT_{73}	—	January 22, 2015	Haleakala	Pan-STARRS 1	·	1.3 km	MPC; JPL
869119	2016 NU_{73}	—	February 23, 2015	Haleakala	Pan-STARRS 1	·	1.3 km	MPC; JPL
869120	2016 NN_{74}	—	October 21, 2012	Mount Lemmon	Mount Lemmon Survey	·	1.2 km	MPC; JPL
869121	2016 NV_{74}	—	April 29, 2011	Mount Lemmon	Mount Lemmon Survey	·	1.0 km	MPC; JPL
869122	2016 NY_{74}	—	July 14, 2016	Haleakala	Pan-STARRS 1	·	1.2 km	MPC; JPL
869123	2016 NM_{75}	—	August 14, 2012	Haleakala	Pan-STARRS 1	·	960 m	MPC; JPL
869124	2016 NZ_{76}	—	September 16, 2012	Catalina	CSS	·	1.2 km	MPC; JPL
869125	2016 ND_{78}	—	October 18, 2011	Kitt Peak	Spacewatch	·	1.9 km	MPC; JPL
869126	2016 NC_{79}	—	July 5, 2016	Haleakala	Pan-STARRS 1	ADE	1.6 km	MPC; JPL
869127	2016 NH_{79}	—	July 6, 2016	Haleakala	Pan-STARRS 1	·	1.0 km	MPC; JPL
869128	2016 NZ_{79}	—	June 12, 2011	Mount Lemmon	Mount Lemmon Survey	·	1.9 km	MPC; JPL
869129	2016 NU_{81}	—	July 8, 2016	Haleakala	Pan-STARRS 1	·	1 km	MPC; JPL
869130	2016 NC_{83}	—	November 4, 2012	Mount Lemmon	Mount Lemmon Survey	·	1.1 km	MPC; JPL
869131	2016 NE_{83}	—	August 11, 2012	Bergisch Gladbach	W. Bickel	MAR	930 m	MPC; JPL
869132	2016 NN_{83}	—	October 7, 2012	Haleakala	Pan-STARRS 1	MAR	780 m	MPC; JPL
869133	2016 NN_{84}	—	September 17, 2012	Mount Lemmon	Mount Lemmon Survey	EUN	770 m	MPC; JPL
869134	2016 NZ_{84}	—	October 4, 2007	Mount Lemmon	Mount Lemmon Survey	·	1.4 km	MPC; JPL
869135	2016 NV_{85}	—	July 11, 2016	Haleakala	Pan-STARRS 1	·	830 m	MPC; JPL
869136	2016 NY_{86}	—	August 11, 2012	Westfield	International Astronomical Search Collaboration	EUN	860 m	MPC; JPL
869137	2016 NW_{87}	—	May 1, 2011	Haleakala	Pan-STARRS 1	EUN	1.0 km	MPC; JPL
869138	2016 NU_{88}	—	January 20, 2013	Kitt Peak	Spacewatch	·	2.3 km	MPC; JPL
869139	2016 NB_{89}	—	July 14, 2016	Haleakala	Pan-STARRS 1	·	980 m	MPC; JPL
869140	2016 NN_{89}	—	July 14, 2016	Haleakala	Pan-STARRS 1	ADE	1.5 km	MPC; JPL
869141	2016 NR_{89}	—	July 14, 2016	Haleakala	Pan-STARRS 1	·	860 m	MPC; JPL
869142	2016 NB_{90}	—	July 14, 2016	Haleakala	Pan-STARRS 1	MAR	770 m	MPC; JPL
869143	2016 NJ_{90}	—	July 11, 2016	Haleakala	Pan-STARRS 1	·	2.3 km	MPC; JPL
869144	2016 NG_{92}	—	July 9, 2016	Haleakala	Pan-STARRS 1	HNS	950 m	MPC; JPL
869145	2016 NA_{93}	—	July 7, 2016	Haleakala	Pan-STARRS 1	·	1.2 km	MPC; JPL
869146	2016 NE_{94}	—	July 13, 2016	Haleakala	Pan-STARRS 1	·	1.7 km	MPC; JPL
869147	2016 NS_{94}	—	July 5, 2016	Haleakala	Pan-STARRS 1	·	1.0 km	MPC; JPL
869148	2016 NH_{96}	—	August 15, 2001	Haleakala	NEAT	·	880 m	MPC; JPL
869149	2016 NS_{96}	—	July 5, 2016	Haleakala	Pan-STARRS 1	·	930 m	MPC; JPL
869150	2016 NU_{96}	—	July 7, 2016	Mount Lemmon	Mount Lemmon Survey	·	1.1 km	MPC; JPL
869151	2016 NE_{97}	—	July 4, 2016	Haleakala	Pan-STARRS 1	·	990 m	MPC; JPL
869152	2016 NL_{98}	—	July 7, 2016	Haleakala	Pan-STARRS 1	·	840 m	MPC; JPL
869153	2016 NZ_{101}	—	July 5, 2016	Mount Lemmon	Mount Lemmon Survey	·	900 m	MPC; JPL
869154	2016 NF_{102}	—	July 4, 2016	Haleakala	Pan-STARRS 1	·	1.4 km	MPC; JPL
869155	2016 NS_{104}	—	July 11, 2016	Haleakala	Pan-STARRS 1	·	520 m	MPC; JPL
869156	2016 NS_{106}	—	July 14, 2016	Haleakala	Pan-STARRS 1	·	800 m	MPC; JPL
869157	2016 NZ_{106}	—	July 14, 2016	Haleakala	Pan-STARRS 1	·	660 m	MPC; JPL
869158	2016 NT_{107}	—	July 9, 2016	Haleakala	Pan-STARRS 1	HNS	740 m	MPC; JPL
869159	2016 NM_{109}	—	July 14, 2016	Mount Lemmon	Mount Lemmon Survey	·	800 m	MPC; JPL
869160	2016 NN_{109}	—	July 11, 2016	Haleakala	Pan-STARRS 1	·	1.3 km	MPC; JPL
869161	2016 NF_{110}	—	July 9, 2016	Haleakala	Pan-STARRS 1	·	990 m	MPC; JPL
869162	2016 NU_{110}	—	July 11, 2016	Haleakala	Pan-STARRS 1	V	430 m	MPC; JPL
869163	2016 NV_{110}	—	July 13, 2016	Haleakala	Pan-STARRS 1	H	390 m	MPC; JPL
869164	2016 NH_{111}	—	July 11, 2016	Haleakala	Pan-STARRS 1	·	530 m	MPC; JPL
869165	2016 NJ_{111}	—	July 14, 2016	Haleakala	Pan-STARRS 1	·	800 m	MPC; JPL
869166	2016 NQ_{111}	—	July 11, 2016	Haleakala	Pan-STARRS 1	PHO	590 m	MPC; JPL
869167	2016 NO_{112}	—	July 14, 2016	Haleakala	Pan-STARRS 1	·	760 m	MPC; JPL
869168	2016 NX_{112}	—	October 6, 2012	Haleakala	Pan-STARRS 1	·	1.1 km	MPC; JPL
869169	2016 NY_{112}	—	July 6, 2016	Haleakala	Pan-STARRS 1	·	970 m	MPC; JPL
869170	2016 NE_{114}	—	July 4, 2016	Haleakala	Pan-STARRS 1	(1547)	1.1 km	MPC; JPL
869171	2016 NN_{114}	—	July 12, 2016	Haleakala	Pan-STARRS 1	·	850 m	MPC; JPL
869172	2016 NC_{115}	—	July 8, 2016	Haleakala	Pan-STARRS 1	·	890 m	MPC; JPL
869173	2016 NK_{115}	—	July 4, 2016	Haleakala	Pan-STARRS 1	·	1.2 km	MPC; JPL
869174	2016 NH_{117}	—	July 7, 2016	Haleakala	Pan-STARRS 1	·	620 m	MPC; JPL
869175	2016 NE_{119}	—	July 15, 2016	Mount Lemmon	Mount Lemmon Survey	NYS	870 m	MPC; JPL
869176	2016 NK_{119}	—	October 14, 2012	Catalina	CSS	·	1.2 km	MPC; JPL
869177	2016 NV_{120}	—	July 4, 2016	Haleakala	Pan-STARRS 1	·	970 m	MPC; JPL
869178	2016 NN_{123}	—	July 12, 2016	Mount Lemmon	Mount Lemmon Survey	·	770 m	MPC; JPL
869179	2016 NH_{124}	—	July 12, 2016	Mount Lemmon	Mount Lemmon Survey	·	870 m	MPC; JPL
869180	2016 NJ_{124}	—	July 11, 2016	Haleakala	Pan-STARRS 1	·	1 km	MPC; JPL
869181	2016 NQ_{124}	—	July 7, 2016	Haleakala	Pan-STARRS 1	NYS	790 m	MPC; JPL
869182	2016 ND_{127}	—	July 6, 2016	Haleakala	Pan-STARRS 1	·	970 m	MPC; JPL
869183	2016 NT_{127}	—	July 9, 2016	Haleakala	Pan-STARRS 1	PHO	690 m	MPC; JPL
869184	2016 NR_{130}	—	July 14, 2016	Mount Lemmon	Mount Lemmon Survey	MAS	460 m	MPC; JPL
869185	2016 NV_{130}	—	July 11, 2016	Haleakala	Pan-STARRS 1	PHO	530 m	MPC; JPL
869186	2016 NY_{131}	—	July 4, 2016	Haleakala	Pan-STARRS 1	·	710 m	MPC; JPL
869187	2016 NR_{133}	—	July 5, 2016	Haleakala	Pan-STARRS 1	·	710 m	MPC; JPL
869188	2016 NT_{134}	—	July 3, 2016	Mount Lemmon	Mount Lemmon Survey	·	1.2 km	MPC; JPL
869189	2016 NZ_{134}	—	September 14, 1998	Kitt Peak	Spacewatch	·	1.4 km	MPC; JPL
869190	2016 NG_{135}	—	July 14, 2016	Haleakala	Pan-STARRS 1	·	980 m	MPC; JPL
869191	2016 NS_{135}	—	July 14, 2016	Haleakala	Pan-STARRS 1	·	1.2 km	MPC; JPL
869192	2016 NO_{137}	—	July 14, 2016	Haleakala	Pan-STARRS 1	·	1.5 km	MPC; JPL
869193	2016 NW_{140}	—	July 5, 2016	Haleakala	Pan-STARRS 1	·	1.2 km	MPC; JPL
869194	2016 NL_{146}	—	June 21, 2007	Mount Lemmon	Mount Lemmon Survey	·	1.0 km	MPC; JPL
869195	2016 NM_{146}	—	July 11, 2016	Haleakala	Pan-STARRS 1	H	310 m	MPC; JPL
869196	2016 NR_{147}	—	July 11, 2016	Haleakala	Pan-STARRS 1	·	1.4 km	MPC; JPL
869197	2016 NC_{149}	—	July 11, 2016	Haleakala	Pan-STARRS 1	·	860 m	MPC; JPL
869198	2016 NH_{149}	—	July 14, 2016	Haleakala	Pan-STARRS 1	·	1.2 km	MPC; JPL
869199	2016 NL_{149}	—	January 25, 2015	Haleakala	Pan-STARRS 1	·	1.3 km	MPC; JPL
869200	2016 NP_{149}	—	July 12, 2016	Mount Lemmon	Mount Lemmon Survey	EOS	1.3 km	MPC; JPL

== 869201–869300 ==
back to top

Designation			Discovery			Properties		Ref
Permanent	Provisional	Named after	Date	Site	Discoverer(s)	Category	Diam.	Ref
869201	2016 NF_{155}	—	July 11, 2016	Haleakala	Pan-STARRS 1	HNS	800 m	MPC; JPL
869202	2016 NH_{155}	—	November 22, 2012	Catalina	CSS	·	1.5 km	MPC; JPL
869203	2016 NR_{155}	—	July 4, 2016	Haleakala	Pan-STARRS 1	·	1.0 km	MPC; JPL
869204	2016 NU_{155}	—	July 11, 2016	Haleakala	Pan-STARRS 1	·	1.2 km	MPC; JPL
869205	2016 NC_{156}	—	July 14, 2016	Haleakala	Pan-STARRS 1	·	1.1 km	MPC; JPL
869206	2016 NL_{156}	—	July 7, 2016	Haleakala	Pan-STARRS 1	·	1.2 km	MPC; JPL
869207	2016 NU_{156}	—	July 14, 2016	Haleakala	Pan-STARRS 1	·	1.1 km	MPC; JPL
869208	2016 NA_{157}	—	July 7, 2016	Haleakala	Pan-STARRS 1	·	1.1 km	MPC; JPL
869209	2016 NJ_{157}	—	July 7, 2016	Haleakala	Pan-STARRS 1	·	1.5 km	MPC; JPL
869210	2016 NR_{157}	—	July 12, 2016	Haleakala	Pan-STARRS 1	·	920 m	MPC; JPL
869211	2016 NT_{157}	—	July 7, 2016	Haleakala	Pan-STARRS 1	·	1.0 km	MPC; JPL
869212	2016 NK_{158}	—	July 7, 2016	Haleakala	Pan-STARRS 1	·	1.1 km	MPC; JPL
869213	2016 NV_{158}	—	July 11, 2016	Haleakala	Pan-STARRS 1	·	1.2 km	MPC; JPL
869214	2016 NN_{159}	—	October 6, 2008	Mount Lemmon	Mount Lemmon Survey	·	1.1 km	MPC; JPL
869215	2016 NO_{159}	—	July 7, 2016	Haleakala	Pan-STARRS 1	·	1.2 km	MPC; JPL
869216	2016 ND_{161}	—	February 25, 2015	Haleakala	Pan-STARRS 1	·	500 m	MPC; JPL
869217	2016 NG_{161}	—	April 6, 2011	Kitt Peak	Spacewatch	·	1.1 km	MPC; JPL
869218	2016 ND_{162}	—	July 13, 2016	Mount Lemmon	Mount Lemmon Survey	·	1.2 km	MPC; JPL
869219	2016 NR_{163}	—	July 12, 2016	Mount Lemmon	Mount Lemmon Survey	NYS	850 m	MPC; JPL
869220	2016 NK_{165}	—	July 7, 2016	Haleakala	Pan-STARRS 1	·	1.1 km	MPC; JPL
869221	2016 NE_{168}	—	July 5, 2016	Haleakala	Pan-STARRS 1	·	940 m	MPC; JPL
869222	2016 NS_{168}	—	July 14, 2016	Haleakala	Pan-STARRS 1	·	1.2 km	MPC; JPL
869223	2016 ND_{191}	—	July 14, 2016	Mount Lemmon	Mount Lemmon Survey	PHO	670 m	MPC; JPL
869224	2016 NG_{193}	—	July 7, 2016	Mauna Kea	COIAS	·	1.5 km	MPC; JPL
869225	2016 NQ_{199}	—	July 14, 2016	Haleakala	Pan-STARRS 1	·	960 m	MPC; JPL
869226	2016 NW_{207}	—	July 5, 2016	Mauna Kea	COIAS	·	1.7 km	MPC; JPL
869227	2016 NZ_{209}	—	July 14, 2016	Haleakala	Pan-STARRS 1	·	1.2 km	MPC; JPL
869228	2016 ON	—	July 23, 2016	SONEAR	SONEAR	AMO	510 m	MPC; JPL
869229	2016 OT	—	June 29, 2016	Haleakala	Pan-STARRS 1	H	480 m	MPC; JPL
869230	2016 OE_{3}	—	July 7, 2016	Mount Lemmon	Mount Lemmon Survey	TIR	2.0 km	MPC; JPL
869231	2016 OT_{4}	—	November 11, 2004	Kitt Peak	Spacewatch	·	1.2 km	MPC; JPL
869232	2016 OJ_{5}	—	July 4, 2016	Haleakala	Pan-STARRS 1	·	490 m	MPC; JPL
869233	2016 OE_{8}	—	July 30, 2016	Haleakala	Pan-STARRS 1	EUN	930 m	MPC; JPL
869234	2016 OM_{8}	—	July 30, 2016	Haleakala	Pan-STARRS 1	·	1.3 km	MPC; JPL
869235	2016 OY_{8}	—	July 31, 2016	Haleakala	Pan-STARRS 1	·	1.3 km	MPC; JPL
869236	2016 OF_{9}	—	July 31, 2016	Haleakala	Pan-STARRS 1	·	1.3 km	MPC; JPL
869237	2016 OL_{9}	—	July 16, 2016	Haleakala	Pan-STARRS 1	H	340 m	MPC; JPL
869238	2016 OQ_{9}	—	July 30, 2016	Haleakala	Pan-STARRS 1	·	2.4 km	MPC; JPL
869239	2016 OC_{10}	—	November 3, 2005	Kitt Peak	Spacewatch	·	2.1 km	MPC; JPL
869240	2016 OL_{11}	—	July 31, 2016	Haleakala	Pan-STARRS 1	·	810 m	MPC; JPL
869241	2016 OV_{11}	—	July 30, 2016	Haleakala	Pan-STARRS 1	·	1.2 km	MPC; JPL
869242	2016 OT_{12}	—	July 30, 2016	Haleakala	Pan-STARRS 1	·	810 m	MPC; JPL
869243 Kuraten	2016 OP_{17}	Kuraten	July 29, 2016	Mauna Kea	COIAS	·	1.7 km	MPC; JPL
869244	2016 PL_{3}	—	August 1, 2016	Haleakala	Pan-STARRS 1	·	1.1 km	MPC; JPL
869245	2016 PQ_{3}	—	October 16, 2012	Mount Lemmon	Mount Lemmon Survey	·	1.1 km	MPC; JPL
869246	2016 PX_{4}	—	April 28, 2012	Kitt Peak	Spacewatch	·	720 m	MPC; JPL
869247	2016 PF_{6}	—	August 1, 2016	Haleakala	Pan-STARRS 1	·	640 m	MPC; JPL
869248	2016 PU_{9}	—	September 14, 2013	Mount Lemmon	Mount Lemmon Survey	·	460 m	MPC; JPL
869249	2016 PR_{10}	—	October 9, 2012	Mount Lemmon	Mount Lemmon Survey	·	1.1 km	MPC; JPL
869250	2016 PJ_{11}	—	February 8, 2011	Mount Lemmon	Mount Lemmon Survey	·	1.3 km	MPC; JPL
869251	2016 PW_{11}	—	August 8, 2012	Haleakala	Pan-STARRS 1	BAR	1.1 km	MPC; JPL
869252	2016 PO_{12}	—	May 1, 2011	Haleakala	Pan-STARRS 1	·	1.0 km	MPC; JPL
869253	2016 PL_{15}	—	August 25, 2011	Piszkéstető	K. Sárneczky	·	2.4 km	MPC; JPL
869254	2016 PJ_{16}	—	July 4, 2016	Haleakala	Pan-STARRS 1	·	810 m	MPC; JPL
869255	2016 PW_{17}	—	August 7, 2016	Haleakala	Pan-STARRS 1	·	1.1 km	MPC; JPL
869256	2016 PF_{18}	—	March 24, 2015	Haleakala	Pan-STARRS 1	·	1.2 km	MPC; JPL
869257	2016 PG_{18}	—	August 7, 2016	Haleakala	Pan-STARRS 1	·	900 m	MPC; JPL
869258	2016 PJ_{18}	—	August 26, 2012	Haleakala	Pan-STARRS 1	·	1.0 km	MPC; JPL
869259	2016 PG_{19}	—	July 8, 2016	Haleakala	Pan-STARRS 1	·	920 m	MPC; JPL
869260	2016 PG_{25}	—	February 14, 2010	Mount Lemmon	Mount Lemmon Survey	·	1.6 km	MPC; JPL
869261	2016 PX_{27}	—	July 5, 2016	Haleakala	Pan-STARRS 1	·	1.6 km	MPC; JPL
869262	2016 PO_{28}	—	August 6, 2016	Haleakala	Pan-STARRS 1	BAR	840 m	MPC; JPL
869263	2016 PN_{29}	—	September 30, 2003	Kitt Peak	Spacewatch	·	1.2 km	MPC; JPL
869264	2016 PG_{31}	—	October 16, 2012	Kitt Peak	Spacewatch	·	1.4 km	MPC; JPL
869265	2016 PX_{41}	—	August 1, 2016	Haleakala	Pan-STARRS 1	·	860 m	MPC; JPL
869266	2016 PZ_{45}	—	October 8, 2012	Mount Lemmon	Mount Lemmon Survey	·	1.1 km	MPC; JPL
869267	2016 PM_{46}	—	October 26, 2011	Haleakala	Pan-STARRS 1	·	2.5 km	MPC; JPL
869268	2016 PR_{46}	—	January 10, 2014	Kitt Peak	Spacewatch	·	800 m	MPC; JPL
869269	2016 PM_{47}	—	October 21, 2006	Mount Lemmon	Mount Lemmon Survey	·	450 m	MPC; JPL
869270	2016 PP_{47}	—	August 7, 2016	Haleakala	Pan-STARRS 1	·	1.3 km	MPC; JPL
869271	2016 PY_{50}	—	October 16, 2012	Mount Lemmon	Mount Lemmon Survey	·	1.0 km	MPC; JPL
869272	2016 PX_{51}	—	August 7, 2016	Haleakala	Pan-STARRS 1	·	1.3 km	MPC; JPL
869273	2016 PC_{52}	—	September 23, 2011	Mount Lemmon	Mount Lemmon Survey	VER	1.7 km	MPC; JPL
869274	2016 PZ_{53}	—	July 30, 2016	Haleakala	Pan-STARRS 1	·	530 m	MPC; JPL
869275	2016 PN_{59}	—	August 7, 2016	Haleakala	Pan-STARRS 1	·	1.2 km	MPC; JPL
869276	2016 PL_{61}	—	October 31, 2008	Kitt Peak	Spacewatch	·	890 m	MPC; JPL
869277	2016 PO_{61}	—	September 17, 2012	Nogales	M. Schwartz, P. R. Holvorcem	·	1.1 km	MPC; JPL
869278	2016 PM_{65}	—	November 28, 2013	Mount Lemmon	Mount Lemmon Survey	·	700 m	MPC; JPL
869279	2016 PH_{73}	—	August 10, 2016	Haleakala	Pan-STARRS 1	·	420 m	MPC; JPL
869280	2016 PR_{74}	—	September 7, 1999	Kitt Peak	Spacewatch	·	870 m	MPC; JPL
869281	2016 PE_{75}	—	December 9, 2012	Piszkéstető	K. Sárneczky	·	1.0 km	MPC; JPL
869282	2016 PW_{79}	—	August 3, 2016	Haleakala	Pan-STARRS 1	3:2 · SHU	4.5 km	MPC; JPL
869283	2016 PN_{80}	—	August 1, 2016	Haleakala	Pan-STARRS 1	H	360 m	MPC; JPL
869284	2016 PD_{81}	—	August 3, 2016	Haleakala	Pan-STARRS 1	H	290 m	MPC; JPL
869285	2016 PD_{82}	—	August 2, 2016	Haleakala	Pan-STARRS 1	·	750 m	MPC; JPL
869286	2016 PC_{83}	—	August 2, 2016	Haleakala	Pan-STARRS 1	·	1.4 km	MPC; JPL
869287	2016 PL_{83}	—	October 10, 2007	Mount Lemmon	Mount Lemmon Survey	·	1.4 km	MPC; JPL
869288	2016 PY_{83}	—	October 22, 2003	Kitt Peak	Spacewatch	·	1.1 km	MPC; JPL
869289	2016 PZ_{83}	—	August 2, 2016	Haleakala	Pan-STARRS 1	BRA	1.2 km	MPC; JPL
869290	2016 PH_{84}	—	August 2, 2016	Haleakala	Pan-STARRS 1	·	1.6 km	MPC; JPL
869291	2016 PV_{85}	—	August 4, 2016	Haleakala	Pan-STARRS 1	·	1.4 km	MPC; JPL
869292	2016 PY_{85}	—	August 6, 2016	Haleakala	Pan-STARRS 1	·	1.2 km	MPC; JPL
869293	2016 PO_{86}	—	September 11, 2007	Mount Lemmon	Mount Lemmon Survey	·	1.2 km	MPC; JPL
869294	2016 PT_{87}	—	August 10, 2016	Haleakala	Pan-STARRS 1	·	1.8 km	MPC; JPL
869295	2016 PA_{88}	—	November 1, 2007	Mount Lemmon	Mount Lemmon Survey	·	1.4 km	MPC; JPL
869296	2016 PF_{88}	—	August 10, 2016	Haleakala	Pan-STARRS 1	·	970 m	MPC; JPL
869297	2016 PM_{90}	—	August 13, 2012	Haleakala	Pan-STARRS 1	V	460 m	MPC; JPL
869298	2016 PA_{91}	—	May 25, 2015	Haleakala	Pan-STARRS 1	·	1.4 km	MPC; JPL
869299	2016 PN_{93}	—	October 15, 2007	Mount Lemmon	Mount Lemmon Survey	·	1.3 km	MPC; JPL
869300	2016 PW_{94}	—	May 18, 2015	Haleakala	Pan-STARRS 1	·	2.2 km	MPC; JPL

== 869301–869400 ==
back to top

Designation			Discovery			Properties		Ref
Permanent	Provisional	Named after	Date	Site	Discoverer(s)	Category	Diam.	Ref
869301	2016 PY_{96}	—	October 15, 2012	Haleakala	Pan-STARRS 1	·	950 m	MPC; JPL
869302	2016 PB_{97}	—	August 2, 2016	Haleakala	Pan-STARRS 1	·	950 m	MPC; JPL
869303	2016 PN_{97}	—	September 17, 2012	Mount Lemmon	Mount Lemmon Survey	·	1.1 km	MPC; JPL
869304	2016 PG_{99}	—	May 13, 2015	Haleakala	Pan-STARRS 1	·	1.9 km	MPC; JPL
869305	2016 PP_{99}	—	January 20, 2009	Mount Lemmon	Mount Lemmon Survey	·	1.1 km	MPC; JPL
869306	2016 PS_{99}	—	November 14, 2012	Kitt Peak	Spacewatch	·	1.0 km	MPC; JPL
869307	2016 PX_{100}	—	November 26, 2009	Mount Lemmon	Mount Lemmon Survey	·	800 m	MPC; JPL
869308	2016 PE_{101}	—	April 24, 2015	Haleakala	Pan-STARRS 1	·	2.0 km	MPC; JPL
869309	2016 PK_{101}	—	October 21, 2012	Haleakala	Pan-STARRS 1	·	1.1 km	MPC; JPL
869310	2016 PO_{102}	—	August 7, 2016	Haleakala	Pan-STARRS 1	·	1.3 km	MPC; JPL
869311	2016 PS_{102}	—	October 18, 2012	Haleakala	Pan-STARRS 1	·	960 m	MPC; JPL
869312	2016 PY_{102}	—	November 30, 2003	Kitt Peak	Spacewatch	·	1.2 km	MPC; JPL
869313	2016 PU_{103}	—	October 18, 2012	Haleakala	Pan-STARRS 1	·	1.1 km	MPC; JPL
869314	2016 PY_{103}	—	August 1, 2016	Haleakala	Pan-STARRS 1	·	1.1 km	MPC; JPL
869315	2016 PE_{104}	—	October 9, 2012	Haleakala	Pan-STARRS 1	·	1 km	MPC; JPL
869316	2016 PN_{104}	—	August 1, 2016	Haleakala	Pan-STARRS 1	·	2.6 km	MPC; JPL
869317	2016 PR_{104}	—	February 20, 2014	Mount Lemmon	Mount Lemmon Survey	·	1.3 km	MPC; JPL
869318	2016 PX_{104}	—	August 1, 2016	Haleakala	Pan-STARRS 1	·	1.2 km	MPC; JPL
869319	2016 PH_{105}	—	October 18, 2012	Haleakala	Pan-STARRS 1	·	930 m	MPC; JPL
869320	2016 PL_{105}	—	August 1, 2016	Haleakala	Pan-STARRS 1	·	930 m	MPC; JPL
869321	2016 PM_{105}	—	October 20, 2012	Haleakala	Pan-STARRS 1	EUN	750 m	MPC; JPL
869322	2016 PY_{105}	—	December 4, 2012	Mount Lemmon	Mount Lemmon Survey	·	1.2 km	MPC; JPL
869323	2016 PJ_{106}	—	October 22, 2012	Haleakala	Pan-STARRS 1	·	1.0 km	MPC; JPL
869324	2016 PM_{106}	—	October 23, 2012	Haleakala	Pan-STARRS 1	EUN	710 m	MPC; JPL
869325	2016 PG_{107}	—	August 2, 2016	Haleakala	Pan-STARRS 1	·	2.2 km	MPC; JPL
869326	2016 PB_{108}	—	September 20, 2003	Kitt Peak	Spacewatch	·	1.5 km	MPC; JPL
869327	2016 PE_{108}	—	February 18, 2015	Haleakala	Pan-STARRS 1	·	1.5 km	MPC; JPL
869328	2016 PM_{109}	—	April 10, 2015	Mount Lemmon	Mount Lemmon Survey	·	1.2 km	MPC; JPL
869329	2016 PQ_{109}	—	August 2, 2016	Haleakala	Pan-STARRS 1	·	1.3 km	MPC; JPL
869330	2016 PR_{109}	—	October 11, 2012	Haleakala	Pan-STARRS 1	·	1.2 km	MPC; JPL
869331	2016 PF_{110}	—	October 27, 2008	Kitt Peak	Spacewatch	·	990 m	MPC; JPL
869332	2016 PD_{111}	—	October 17, 2012	Mount Lemmon	Mount Lemmon Survey	·	1.3 km	MPC; JPL
869333	2016 PE_{112}	—	August 2, 2016	Haleakala	Pan-STARRS 1	·	920 m	MPC; JPL
869334	2016 PN_{114}	—	April 24, 2015	Haleakala	Pan-STARRS 1	·	1.2 km	MPC; JPL
869335	2016 PD_{115}	—	August 26, 2012	Haleakala	Pan-STARRS 1	·	1.0 km	MPC; JPL
869336	2016 PQ_{115}	—	April 23, 2015	Haleakala	Pan-STARRS 1	·	1.3 km	MPC; JPL
869337	2016 PS_{115}	—	December 31, 2013	Mount Lemmon	Mount Lemmon Survey	·	1.2 km	MPC; JPL
869338	2016 PT_{115}	—	October 22, 2012	Haleakala	Pan-STARRS 1	·	1.1 km	MPC; JPL
869339	2016 PD_{117}	—	September 18, 2003	Kitt Peak	Spacewatch	·	1.0 km	MPC; JPL
869340	2016 PQ_{118}	—	November 25, 2011	Haleakala	Pan-STARRS 1	·	2.1 km	MPC; JPL
869341	2016 PT_{118}	—	October 10, 2012	Nogales	M. Schwartz, P. R. Holvorcem	·	1.4 km	MPC; JPL
869342	2016 PN_{119}	—	December 21, 2008	Kitt Peak	Spacewatch	·	1.2 km	MPC; JPL
869343	2016 PW_{119}	—	September 16, 2012	Kitt Peak	Spacewatch	·	1.2 km	MPC; JPL
869344	2016 PS_{120}	—	January 25, 2014	Haleakala	Pan-STARRS 1	·	1.3 km	MPC; JPL
869345	2016 PQ_{121}	—	March 21, 2015	Haleakala	Pan-STARRS 1	·	930 m	MPC; JPL
869346	2016 PV_{121}	—	August 9, 2016	Haleakala	Pan-STARRS 1	·	1.9 km	MPC; JPL
869347	2016 PE_{123}	—	November 13, 2012	Mount Lemmon	Mount Lemmon Survey	(5)	870 m	MPC; JPL
869348	2016 PF_{123}	—	October 22, 2012	Haleakala	Pan-STARRS 1	(5)	880 m	MPC; JPL
869349	2016 PG_{123}	—	September 13, 2007	Kitt Peak	Spacewatch	·	1.2 km	MPC; JPL
869350	2016 PY_{123}	—	August 10, 2016	Haleakala	Pan-STARRS 1	·	830 m	MPC; JPL
869351	2016 PH_{124}	—	August 9, 2007	Kitt Peak	Spacewatch	·	1.2 km	MPC; JPL
869352	2016 PO_{124}	—	August 10, 2016	Haleakala	Pan-STARRS 1	·	1.3 km	MPC; JPL
869353	2016 PS_{124}	—	October 24, 2011	Haleakala	Pan-STARRS 1	·	1.8 km	MPC; JPL
869354	2016 PO_{125}	—	August 12, 2016	Haleakala	Pan-STARRS 1	BRA	1.2 km	MPC; JPL
869355	2016 PC_{126}	—	August 14, 2016	Haleakala	Pan-STARRS 1	·	1.3 km	MPC; JPL
869356	2016 PK_{126}	—	December 13, 2012	Mount Lemmon	Mount Lemmon Survey	GEF	780 m	MPC; JPL
869357	2016 PS_{126}	—	March 21, 2015	Mount Lemmon	Mount Lemmon Survey	·	1.1 km	MPC; JPL
869358	2016 PP_{127}	—	August 15, 2016	Haleakala	Pan-STARRS 1	·	1.5 km	MPC; JPL
869359	2016 PR_{128}	—	August 10, 2016	Haleakala	Pan-STARRS 1	·	1.1 km	MPC; JPL
869360	2016 PS_{128}	—	August 3, 2016	Haleakala	Pan-STARRS 1	·	1.4 km	MPC; JPL
869361	2016 PG_{130}	—	August 2, 2016	Haleakala	Pan-STARRS 1	·	940 m	MPC; JPL
869362	2016 PT_{130}	—	October 26, 2011	Haleakala	Pan-STARRS 1	·	1.9 km	MPC; JPL
869363	2016 PG_{131}	—	August 2, 2016	Haleakala	Pan-STARRS 1	·	1.6 km	MPC; JPL
869364	2016 PH_{131}	—	August 3, 2016	Haleakala	Pan-STARRS 1	·	1.0 km	MPC; JPL
869365	2016 PN_{131}	—	August 9, 2016	Haleakala	Pan-STARRS 1	·	1.1 km	MPC; JPL
869366	2016 PW_{131}	—	August 10, 2016	Haleakala	Pan-STARRS 1	·	1.3 km	MPC; JPL
869367	2016 PE_{132}	—	October 24, 2008	Kitt Peak	Spacewatch	·	1.0 km	MPC; JPL
869368	2016 PB_{133}	—	August 3, 2016	Haleakala	Pan-STARRS 1	·	1.5 km	MPC; JPL
869369	2016 PQ_{134}	—	August 12, 2016	Haleakala	Pan-STARRS 1	·	880 m	MPC; JPL
869370	2016 PG_{136}	—	August 2, 2016	Haleakala	Pan-STARRS 1	·	1.1 km	MPC; JPL
869371	2016 PR_{139}	—	June 4, 2011	Cerro Tololo	EURONEAR	BRA	1.0 km	MPC; JPL
869372	2016 PC_{140}	—	August 14, 2016	Haleakala	Pan-STARRS 1	·	1.0 km	MPC; JPL
869373	2016 PM_{140}	—	August 2, 2016	Haleakala	Pan-STARRS 1	·	820 m	MPC; JPL
869374	2016 PM_{141}	—	October 17, 2012	Calar Alto	S. Mottola, S. Hellmich	·	890 m	MPC; JPL
869375	2016 PN_{142}	—	August 3, 2016	Haleakala	Pan-STARRS 1	·	510 m	MPC; JPL
869376	2016 PF_{143}	—	March 25, 2007	Mount Lemmon	Mount Lemmon Survey	·	1.1 km	MPC; JPL
869377	2016 PA_{146}	—	August 7, 2016	Haleakala	Pan-STARRS 1	·	1.5 km	MPC; JPL
869378	2016 PW_{146}	—	August 3, 2016	Haleakala	Pan-STARRS 1	·	820 m	MPC; JPL
869379	2016 PQ_{149}	—	August 10, 2016	Haleakala	Pan-STARRS 1	HNS	720 m	MPC; JPL
869380	2016 PT_{149}	—	August 3, 2016	Haleakala	Pan-STARRS 1	·	1.5 km	MPC; JPL
869381	2016 PL_{150}	—	August 7, 2016	Haleakala	Pan-STARRS 1	·	1.1 km	MPC; JPL
869382	2016 PO_{150}	—	August 2, 2016	Haleakala	Pan-STARRS 1	·	1.1 km	MPC; JPL
869383	2016 PA_{151}	—	August 3, 2016	Haleakala	Pan-STARRS 1	·	1.2 km	MPC; JPL
869384	2016 PY_{151}	—	September 18, 2012	Kitt Peak	Spacewatch	·	990 m	MPC; JPL
869385	2016 PE_{152}	—	August 3, 2016	Haleakala	Pan-STARRS 1	·	2.5 km	MPC; JPL
869386	2016 PE_{153}	—	August 3, 2016	Haleakala	Pan-STARRS 1	·	750 m	MPC; JPL
869387	2016 PB_{155}	—	August 2, 2016	Haleakala	Pan-STARRS 1	·	2.0 km	MPC; JPL
869388	2016 PP_{155}	—	August 8, 2016	Haleakala	Pan-STARRS 1	JUN	670 m	MPC; JPL
869389	2016 PW_{155}	—	August 3, 2016	Haleakala	Pan-STARRS 1	·	490 m	MPC; JPL
869390	2016 PG_{156}	—	August 2, 2016	Haleakala	Pan-STARRS 1	·	1.3 km	MPC; JPL
869391	2016 PM_{158}	—	August 1, 2016	Haleakala	Pan-STARRS 1	·	980 m	MPC; JPL
869392	2016 PP_{158}	—	August 2, 2016	Haleakala	Pan-STARRS 1	·	1.1 km	MPC; JPL
869393	2016 PU_{159}	—	August 1, 2016	Haleakala	Pan-STARRS 1	·	1.0 km	MPC; JPL
869394	2016 PZ_{159}	—	August 7, 2016	Haleakala	Pan-STARRS 1	·	1.1 km	MPC; JPL
869395	2016 PG_{160}	—	July 9, 2016	Mount Lemmon	Mount Lemmon Survey	·	1.3 km	MPC; JPL
869396	2016 PV_{160}	—	August 1, 2016	Haleakala	Pan-STARRS 1	·	1.6 km	MPC; JPL
869397	2016 PC_{162}	—	October 1, 2005	Catalina	CSS	·	910 m	MPC; JPL
869398	2016 PF_{162}	—	August 14, 2016	Haleakala	Pan-STARRS 1	EUN	890 m	MPC; JPL
869399	2016 PL_{162}	—	September 19, 2006	Catalina	CSS	·	620 m	MPC; JPL
869400	2016 PE_{164}	—	August 7, 2016	Haleakala	Pan-STARRS 1	·	1.3 km	MPC; JPL

== 869401–869500 ==
back to top

Designation			Discovery			Properties		Ref
Permanent	Provisional	Named after	Date	Site	Discoverer(s)	Category	Diam.	Ref
869401	2016 PR_{166}	—	July 5, 2016	Haleakala	Pan-STARRS 1	V	430 m	MPC; JPL
869402	2016 PY_{166}	—	August 2, 2016	Haleakala	Pan-STARRS 1	·	840 m	MPC; JPL
869403	2016 PS_{167}	—	August 10, 2016	Haleakala	Pan-STARRS 1	THM	1.9 km	MPC; JPL
869404	2016 PN_{168}	—	August 14, 2016	Haleakala	Pan-STARRS 1	·	1.9 km	MPC; JPL
869405	2016 PX_{168}	—	August 2, 2016	Haleakala	Pan-STARRS 1	·	1.8 km	MPC; JPL
869406	2016 PM_{169}	—	August 8, 2016	Haleakala	Pan-STARRS 1	·	860 m	MPC; JPL
869407	2016 PD_{172}	—	August 6, 2016	Haleakala	Pan-STARRS 1	·	1.3 km	MPC; JPL
869408	2016 PM_{172}	—	August 1, 2016	Haleakala	Pan-STARRS 1	·	910 m	MPC; JPL
869409	2016 PC_{173}	—	August 10, 2016	Haleakala	Pan-STARRS 1	NYS	820 m	MPC; JPL
869410	2016 PD_{173}	—	August 10, 2016	Haleakala	Pan-STARRS 1	THM	1.5 km	MPC; JPL
869411	2016 PX_{174}	—	August 2, 2016	Haleakala	Pan-STARRS 1	·	870 m	MPC; JPL
869412	2016 PU_{176}	—	August 14, 2016	Haleakala	Pan-STARRS 1	·	1.4 km	MPC; JPL
869413	2016 PH_{177}	—	August 1, 2016	Haleakala	Pan-STARRS 1	·	900 m	MPC; JPL
869414	2016 PF_{178}	—	August 2, 2016	Haleakala	Pan-STARRS 1	·	970 m	MPC; JPL
869415	2016 PX_{181}	—	August 3, 2016	Haleakala	Pan-STARRS 1	·	790 m	MPC; JPL
869416	2016 PQ_{182}	—	August 1, 2016	Haleakala	Pan-STARRS 1	PHO	590 m	MPC; JPL
869417	2016 PP_{185}	—	August 2, 2016	Haleakala	Pan-STARRS 1	·	860 m	MPC; JPL
869418	2016 PW_{188}	—	August 2, 2016	Haleakala	Pan-STARRS 1	PHO	500 m	MPC; JPL
869419	2016 PD_{192}	—	August 2, 2016	Haleakala	Pan-STARRS 1	·	1.0 km	MPC; JPL
869420	2016 PX_{192}	—	August 3, 2016	Haleakala	Pan-STARRS 1	·	1.0 km	MPC; JPL
869421	2016 PN_{193}	—	August 1, 2016	Haleakala	Pan-STARRS 1	·	1.4 km	MPC; JPL
869422	2016 PP_{193}	—	August 1, 2016	Haleakala	Pan-STARRS 1	·	1.2 km	MPC; JPL
869423	2016 PV_{193}	—	August 3, 2016	Haleakala	Pan-STARRS 1	GEF	900 m	MPC; JPL
869424	2016 PW_{193}	—	August 3, 2016	Haleakala	Pan-STARRS 1	·	1.5 km	MPC; JPL
869425	2016 PX_{193}	—	September 19, 2003	Anderson Mesa	LONEOS	·	1.1 km	MPC; JPL
869426	2016 PR_{194}	—	August 2, 2016	Haleakala	Pan-STARRS 1	GEF	850 m	MPC; JPL
869427	2016 PG_{196}	—	August 2, 2016	Haleakala	Pan-STARRS 1	·	480 m	MPC; JPL
869428	2016 PQ_{196}	—	August 2, 2016	Haleakala	Pan-STARRS 1	·	2.8 km	MPC; JPL
869429	2016 PB_{199}	—	August 3, 2016	Haleakala	Pan-STARRS 1	·	1.2 km	MPC; JPL
869430	2016 PU_{199}	—	August 8, 2016	Haleakala	Pan-STARRS 1	·	710 m	MPC; JPL
869431	2016 PN_{200}	—	August 3, 2016	Haleakala	Pan-STARRS 1	·	1.2 km	MPC; JPL
869432	2016 PS_{201}	—	August 8, 2016	Haleakala	Pan-STARRS 1	·	1.1 km	MPC; JPL
869433	2016 PE_{203}	—	August 6, 2016	Haleakala	Pan-STARRS 1	·	1.2 km	MPC; JPL
869434	2016 PG_{204}	—	August 3, 2016	Haleakala	Pan-STARRS 1	·	1.2 km	MPC; JPL
869435	2016 PN_{205}	—	August 3, 2016	Haleakala	Pan-STARRS 1	·	540 m	MPC; JPL
869436	2016 PM_{206}	—	August 10, 2016	Haleakala	Pan-STARRS 1	·	2.3 km	MPC; JPL
869437	2016 PO_{206}	—	August 8, 2016	Haleakala	Pan-STARRS 1	AGN	700 m	MPC; JPL
869438	2016 PL_{211}	—	August 7, 2016	Haleakala	Pan-STARRS 1	EOS	1.4 km	MPC; JPL
869439	2016 PA_{215}	—	August 7, 2016	Haleakala	Pan-STARRS 1	·	1.5 km	MPC; JPL
869440	2016 PG_{215}	—	August 12, 2016	Haleakala	Pan-STARRS 1	·	1.7 km	MPC; JPL
869441	2016 PJ_{217}	—	August 2, 2016	Haleakala	Pan-STARRS 1	·	1.3 km	MPC; JPL
869442	2016 PU_{221}	—	August 2, 2016	Haleakala	Pan-STARRS 1	V	450 m	MPC; JPL
869443	2016 PV_{221}	—	August 1, 2016	Haleakala	Pan-STARRS 1	·	560 m	MPC; JPL
869444	2016 PF_{226}	—	August 3, 2016	Haleakala	Pan-STARRS 1	·	1.2 km	MPC; JPL
869445	2016 PZ_{227}	—	August 2, 2016	Haleakala	Pan-STARRS 1	·	1.2 km	MPC; JPL
869446	2016 PQ_{228}	—	August 8, 2016	Haleakala	Pan-STARRS 1	WIT	650 m	MPC; JPL
869447	2016 PX_{228}	—	August 3, 2016	Haleakala	Pan-STARRS 1	·	990 m	MPC; JPL
869448	2016 PS_{229}	—	August 8, 2016	Haleakala	Pan-STARRS 1	·	1.2 km	MPC; JPL
869449	2016 PT_{229}	—	August 3, 2016	Haleakala	Pan-STARRS 1	WIT	620 m	MPC; JPL
869450	2016 PH_{230}	—	August 7, 2016	Haleakala	Pan-STARRS 1	WIT	630 m	MPC; JPL
869451	2016 PJ_{230}	—	August 3, 2016	Haleakala	Pan-STARRS 1	AGN	830 m	MPC; JPL
869452	2016 PM_{230}	—	August 8, 2016	Haleakala	Pan-STARRS 1	·	1.2 km	MPC; JPL
869453	2016 PP_{230}	—	August 14, 2016	Haleakala	Pan-STARRS 1	·	1.2 km	MPC; JPL
869454	2016 PS_{230}	—	August 14, 2016	Haleakala	Pan-STARRS 1	·	1.1 km	MPC; JPL
869455	2016 PS_{231}	—	August 7, 2016	Haleakala	Pan-STARRS 1	·	1.2 km	MPC; JPL
869456	2016 PU_{231}	—	October 13, 2012	Catalina	CSS	·	1.1 km	MPC; JPL
869457	2016 PC_{232}	—	August 3, 2016	Haleakala	Pan-STARRS 1	·	1.0 km	MPC; JPL
869458	2016 PK_{233}	—	August 3, 2016	Haleakala	Pan-STARRS 1	·	1.2 km	MPC; JPL
869459	2016 PV_{233}	—	October 13, 2007	Mount Lemmon	Mount Lemmon Survey	·	1.3 km	MPC; JPL
869460	2016 PD_{237}	—	August 2, 2016	Haleakala	Pan-STARRS 1	·	1.5 km	MPC; JPL
869461	2016 PQ_{237}	—	August 2, 2016	Haleakala	Pan-STARRS 1	·	1.5 km	MPC; JPL
869462	2016 PT_{237}	—	August 12, 2016	Haleakala	Pan-STARRS 1	GAL	1.2 km	MPC; JPL
869463	2016 PD_{242}	—	August 1, 2016	Haleakala	Pan-STARRS 1	·	550 m	MPC; JPL
869464	2016 PX_{244}	—	August 2, 2016	Haleakala	Pan-STARRS 1	·	1.2 km	MPC; JPL
869465	2016 PH_{245}	—	August 12, 2016	Haleakala	Pan-STARRS 1	AEO	810 m	MPC; JPL
869466	2016 PZ_{245}	—	February 25, 2015	Haleakala	Pan-STARRS 1	·	910 m	MPC; JPL
869467	2016 PL_{246}	—	August 3, 2016	Haleakala	Pan-STARRS 1	·	490 m	MPC; JPL
869468	2016 PB_{247}	—	August 1, 2016	Haleakala	Pan-STARRS 1	·	1.5 km	MPC; JPL
869469	2016 PT_{247}	—	August 8, 2016	Haleakala	Pan-STARRS 1	·	1.2 km	MPC; JPL
869470	2016 PD_{248}	—	August 6, 2016	Haleakala	Pan-STARRS 1	·	1.3 km	MPC; JPL
869471	2016 PX_{251}	—	August 2, 2016	Haleakala	Pan-STARRS 1	3:2	3.8 km	MPC; JPL
869472	2016 PS_{252}	—	August 2, 2016	Haleakala	Pan-STARRS 1	3:2	3.9 km	MPC; JPL
869473	2016 PO_{255}	—	August 7, 2016	Haleakala	Pan-STARRS 1	·	2.1 km	MPC; JPL
869474	2016 PB_{266}	—	August 7, 2016	Haleakala	Pan-STARRS 1	EOS	1.3 km	MPC; JPL
869475	2016 PN_{266}	—	January 24, 2014	Haleakala	Pan-STARRS 1	·	1.7 km	MPC; JPL
869476	2016 PA_{283}	—	August 8, 2016	Haleakala	Pan-STARRS 1	·	970 m	MPC; JPL
869477	2016 PG_{288}	—	October 16, 2006	Kitt Peak	Spacewatch	·	380 m	MPC; JPL
869478	2016 PR_{297}	—	August 9, 2016	Mauna Kea	COIAS	·	890 m	MPC; JPL
869479	2016 PU_{299}	—	August 9, 2016	Mauna Kea	COIAS	·	940 m	MPC; JPL
869480	2016 PB_{302}	—	August 9, 2016	Mauna Kea	COIAS	·	590 m	MPC; JPL
869481	2016 PE_{313}	—	August 1, 2016	Mauna Kea	COIAS	·	430 m	MPC; JPL
869482	2016 PK_{314}	—	September 26, 2005	Sacramento Peak	SDSS Collaboration	·	1.7 km	MPC; JPL
869483	2016 PL_{318}	—	February 4, 2019	Haleakala	Pan-STARRS 1	·	1.5 km	MPC; JPL
869484	2016 PS_{320}	—	August 10, 2016	Haleakala	Pan-STARRS 1	·	1.3 km	MPC; JPL
869485	2016 QH	—	July 12, 2016	Mount Lemmon	Mount Lemmon Survey	·	1.2 km	MPC; JPL
869486	2016 QM	—	August 26, 1998	Xinglong County	SCAP	ERI	920 m	MPC; JPL
869487	2016 QR	—	September 11, 2005	Kitt Peak	Spacewatch	NYS	920 m	MPC; JPL
869488	2016 QV_{4}	—	June 7, 2016	Haleakala	Pan-STARRS 1	EUN	910 m	MPC; JPL
869489	2016 QD_{5}	—	July 14, 2016	Haleakala	Pan-STARRS 1	·	480 m	MPC; JPL
869490	2016 QT_{8}	—	September 5, 2007	Catalina	CSS	·	1.4 km	MPC; JPL
869491	2016 QW_{8}	—	July 7, 2016	Haleakala	Pan-STARRS 1	JUN	820 m	MPC; JPL
869492	2016 QF_{11}	—	February 26, 2014	Haleakala	Pan-STARRS 1	·	1.3 km	MPC; JPL
869493	2016 QW_{11}	—	September 21, 2003	Palomar	NEAT	EUN	990 m	MPC; JPL
869494	2016 QZ_{12}	—	July 7, 2016	Haleakala	Pan-STARRS 1	·	1.1 km	MPC; JPL
869495	2016 QN_{14}	—	September 13, 2007	Mount Lemmon	Mount Lemmon Survey	·	1.4 km	MPC; JPL
869496	2016 QA_{15}	—	July 7, 2016	Haleakala	Pan-STARRS 1	·	1.1 km	MPC; JPL
869497	2016 QC_{16}	—	October 15, 2012	Haleakala	Pan-STARRS 1	·	1.1 km	MPC; JPL
869498	2016 QH_{17}	—	November 4, 2007	Kitt Peak	Spacewatch	·	1.5 km	MPC; JPL
869499	2016 QJ_{17}	—	September 23, 2011	Haleakala	Pan-STARRS 1	·	1.9 km	MPC; JPL
869500	2016 QH_{18}	—	September 18, 2003	Kitt Peak	Spacewatch	·	1.1 km	MPC; JPL

== 869501–869600 ==
back to top

Designation			Discovery			Properties		Ref
Permanent	Provisional	Named after	Date	Site	Discoverer(s)	Category	Diam.	Ref
869501	2016 QC_{19}	—	July 11, 2016	Haleakala	Pan-STARRS 1	EUN	860 m	MPC; JPL
869502	2016 QC_{20}	—	August 26, 2016	Haleakala	Pan-STARRS 1	·	1.3 km	MPC; JPL
869503	2016 QG_{20}	—	December 1, 2003	Kitt Peak	Spacewatch	·	480 m	MPC; JPL
869504	2016 QR_{21}	—	August 26, 2016	Haleakala	Pan-STARRS 1	·	1.4 km	MPC; JPL
869505	2016 QO_{22}	—	October 11, 2012	Haleakala	Pan-STARRS 1	·	950 m	MPC; JPL
869506	2016 QS_{22}	—	August 26, 2016	Haleakala	Pan-STARRS 1	·	1.3 km	MPC; JPL
869507	2016 QC_{23}	—	September 27, 2011	Mount Lemmon	Mount Lemmon Survey	·	1.3 km	MPC; JPL
869508	2016 QK_{24}	—	August 26, 2016	Haleakala	Pan-STARRS 1	·	1.2 km	MPC; JPL
869509	2016 QC_{25}	—	October 19, 2011	Haleakala	Pan-STARRS 1	EOS	1.4 km	MPC; JPL
869510	2016 QY_{25}	—	October 28, 2006	Kitt Peak	Spacewatch	·	450 m	MPC; JPL
869511	2016 QF_{26}	—	January 13, 2011	Kitt Peak	Spacewatch	·	480 m	MPC; JPL
869512	2016 QH_{26}	—	August 14, 2016	Haleakala	Pan-STARRS 1	·	990 m	MPC; JPL
869513	2016 QX_{27}	—	September 30, 2003	Kitt Peak	Spacewatch	·	1.1 km	MPC; JPL
869514	2016 QC_{31}	—	April 23, 2015	Haleakala	Pan-STARRS 1	·	1.4 km	MPC; JPL
869515	2016 QM_{31}	—	November 28, 2013	Kitt Peak	Spacewatch	·	540 m	MPC; JPL
869516	2016 QR_{32}	—	September 28, 1994	Kitt Peak	Spacewatch	ADE	1.3 km	MPC; JPL
869517	2016 QD_{34}	—	October 1, 2013	Kitt Peak	Spacewatch	·	520 m	MPC; JPL
869518	2016 QH_{36}	—	September 23, 2011	Haleakala	Pan-STARRS 1	·	1.6 km	MPC; JPL
869519	2016 QY_{38}	—	September 18, 2003	Palomar	NEAT	·	1.2 km	MPC; JPL
869520	2016 QV_{39}	—	August 28, 2016	Mount Lemmon	Mount Lemmon Survey	EOS	1.3 km	MPC; JPL
869521	2016 QJ_{44}	—	October 31, 2008	Catalina	CSS	APO · PHA	320 m	MPC; JPL
869522	2016 QE_{45}	—	August 30, 2016	Haleakala	Pan-STARRS 1	APO · PHA	160 m	MPC; JPL
869523	2016 QX_{45}	—	November 13, 2006	Kitt Peak	Spacewatch	·	570 m	MPC; JPL
869524	2016 QN_{51}	—	October 9, 2012	Kitt Peak	Spacewatch	·	1.0 km	MPC; JPL
869525	2016 QA_{52}	—	August 3, 2016	Haleakala	Pan-STARRS 1	·	540 m	MPC; JPL
869526	2016 QZ_{52}	—	August 28, 2016	Mount Lemmon	Mount Lemmon Survey	·	1.2 km	MPC; JPL
869527	2016 QH_{53}	—	November 27, 2012	Mount Lemmon	Mount Lemmon Survey	·	1.5 km	MPC; JPL
869528	2016 QA_{55}	—	August 15, 2016	Haleakala	Pan-STARRS 1	·	870 m	MPC; JPL
869529	2016 QW_{57}	—	December 1, 2008	Mount Lemmon	Mount Lemmon Survey	·	1.0 km	MPC; JPL
869530	2016 QB_{59}	—	May 22, 2015	Cerro Paranal	Gaia Ground Based Optical Tracking	·	1.5 km	MPC; JPL
869531	2016 QC_{59}	—	June 7, 2016	Haleakala	Pan-STARRS 1	·	870 m	MPC; JPL
869532	2016 QJ_{59}	—	October 10, 2012	Haleakala	Pan-STARRS 1	·	1.1 km	MPC; JPL
869533	2016 QS_{59}	—	October 31, 2008	Kitt Peak	Spacewatch	·	910 m	MPC; JPL
869534	2016 QF_{60}	—	August 12, 2012	Kitt Peak	Spacewatch	·	1.2 km	MPC; JPL
869535	2016 QM_{62}	—	April 13, 2012	Haleakala	Pan-STARRS 1	·	480 m	MPC; JPL
869536	2016 QO_{66}	—	July 7, 2016	Haleakala	Pan-STARRS 1	·	880 m	MPC; JPL
869537	2016 QT_{67}	—	February 10, 2014	Haleakala	Pan-STARRS 1	·	1.4 km	MPC; JPL
869538	2016 QW_{72}	—	September 28, 2006	Kitt Peak	Spacewatch	·	570 m	MPC; JPL
869539	2016 QT_{75}	—	December 5, 2012	Mount Lemmon	Mount Lemmon Survey	·	1.6 km	MPC; JPL
869540	2016 QY_{78}	—	October 13, 1999	Sacramento Peak	SDSS	JUN	600 m	MPC; JPL
869541	2016 QR_{79}	—	August 28, 2016	Mount Lemmon	Mount Lemmon Survey	·	1.5 km	MPC; JPL
869542	2016 QT_{79}	—	August 3, 2016	Haleakala	Pan-STARRS 1	·	1.3 km	MPC; JPL
869543	2016 QZ_{80}	—	July 7, 2016	Mount Lemmon	Mount Lemmon Survey	·	2.7 km	MPC; JPL
869544	2016 QT_{81}	—	July 7, 2016	Mount Lemmon	Mount Lemmon Survey	·	2.4 km	MPC; JPL
869545	2016 QG_{82}	—	November 30, 2008	Kitt Peak	Spacewatch	EUN	1.3 km	MPC; JPL
869546	2016 QT_{84}	—	October 20, 2012	Kitt Peak	Spacewatch	·	1.2 km	MPC; JPL
869547	2016 QD_{85}	—	September 16, 2012	Kitt Peak	Spacewatch	·	920 m	MPC; JPL
869548	2016 QF_{90}	—	August 16, 2016	Haleakala	Pan-STARRS 1	·	1.6 km	MPC; JPL
869549	2016 QL_{90}	—	August 17, 2016	Haleakala	Pan-STARRS 1	·	1.3 km	MPC; JPL
869550	2016 QN_{90}	—	January 1, 2009	Mount Lemmon	Mount Lemmon Survey	·	1.1 km	MPC; JPL
869551	2016 QB_{93}	—	January 20, 2014	Mount Lemmon	Mount Lemmon Survey	·	1.1 km	MPC; JPL
869552	2016 QZ_{93}	—	October 21, 2012	Haleakala	Pan-STARRS 1	·	1.2 km	MPC; JPL
869553	2016 QV_{94}	—	July 13, 2016	Haleakala	Pan-STARRS 1	HNS	700 m	MPC; JPL
869554	2016 QK_{95}	—	August 30, 2016	Haleakala	Pan-STARRS 1	JUN	820 m	MPC; JPL
869555	2016 QQ_{95}	—	August 29, 2016	Mount Lemmon	Mount Lemmon Survey	·	1.7 km	MPC; JPL
869556	2016 QU_{95}	—	August 30, 2016	Haleakala	Pan-STARRS 1	·	990 m	MPC; JPL
869557	2016 QZ_{95}	—	August 30, 2016	Mount Lemmon	Mount Lemmon Survey	·	1.5 km	MPC; JPL
869558	2016 QB_{97}	—	August 16, 2016	Haleakala	Pan-STARRS 1	·	1.3 km	MPC; JPL
869559	2016 QF_{97}	—	August 28, 2016	XuYi	PMO NEO Survey Program	H	640 m	MPC; JPL
869560	2016 QP_{97}	—	August 29, 2009	Kitt Peak	Spacewatch	·	610 m	MPC; JPL
869561	2016 QT_{97}	—	August 29, 2016	Mount Lemmon	Mount Lemmon Survey	·	690 m	MPC; JPL
869562	2016 QL_{98}	—	August 17, 2016	Haleakala	Pan-STARRS 1	·	1.4 km	MPC; JPL
869563	2016 QL_{99}	—	August 27, 2016	Haleakala	Pan-STARRS 1	·	840 m	MPC; JPL
869564	2016 QQ_{99}	—	August 27, 2016	Haleakala	Pan-STARRS 1	·	620 m	MPC; JPL
869565	2016 QN_{101}	—	August 27, 2016	XuYi	PMO NEO Survey Program	·	1.1 km	MPC; JPL
869566	2016 QP_{102}	—	August 28, 2016	Mount Lemmon	Mount Lemmon Survey	·	530 m	MPC; JPL
869567	2016 QB_{104}	—	August 28, 2016	Mount Lemmon	Mount Lemmon Survey	·	1.2 km	MPC; JPL
869568	2016 QD_{104}	—	August 30, 2016	Haleakala	Pan-STARRS 1	V	480 m	MPC; JPL
869569	2016 QV_{104}	—	August 30, 2016	Mount Lemmon	Mount Lemmon Survey	·	1.7 km	MPC; JPL
869570	2016 QX_{104}	—	August 30, 2016	Mount Lemmon	Mount Lemmon Survey	·	1.5 km	MPC; JPL
869571	2016 QQ_{105}	—	August 26, 2016	Haleakala	Pan-STARRS 1	·	560 m	MPC; JPL
869572	2016 QU_{106}	—	August 28, 2016	Mount Lemmon	Mount Lemmon Survey	JUN	650 m	MPC; JPL
869573	2016 QW_{107}	—	August 17, 2016	Haleakala	Pan-STARRS 1	·	760 m	MPC; JPL
869574	2016 QP_{108}	—	October 2, 2006	Kitt Peak	Spacewatch	·	520 m	MPC; JPL
869575	2016 QF_{110}	—	August 28, 2016	Mount Lemmon	Mount Lemmon Survey	·	1.4 km	MPC; JPL
869576	2016 QA_{112}	—	August 30, 2016	Haleakala	Pan-STARRS 1	·	1.3 km	MPC; JPL
869577	2016 QH_{113}	—	August 30, 2016	Haleakala	Pan-STARRS 1	·	920 m	MPC; JPL
869578	2016 QL_{115}	—	August 30, 2016	Haleakala	Pan-STARRS 1	·	750 m	MPC; JPL
869579	2016 QE_{116}	—	August 30, 2016	Mount Lemmon	Mount Lemmon Survey	PHO	660 m	MPC; JPL
869580	2016 QF_{117}	—	August 3, 2016	Haleakala	Pan-STARRS 1	NYS	710 m	MPC; JPL
869581	2016 QW_{120}	—	August 27, 2016	Haleakala	Pan-STARRS 1	·	820 m	MPC; JPL
869582	2016 QM_{121}	—	August 28, 2016	Mount Lemmon	Mount Lemmon Survey	·	530 m	MPC; JPL
869583	2016 QP_{122}	—	August 29, 2016	Mount Lemmon	Mount Lemmon Survey	·	2.0 km	MPC; JPL
869584	2016 QV_{122}	—	August 28, 2016	Mount Lemmon	Mount Lemmon Survey	·	1.3 km	MPC; JPL
869585	2016 QQ_{123}	—	March 29, 2012	Mount Lemmon	Mount Lemmon Survey	·	460 m	MPC; JPL
869586	2016 QC_{125}	—	August 28, 2016	Mount Lemmon	Mount Lemmon Survey	·	1.3 km	MPC; JPL
869587	2016 QP_{127}	—	August 3, 2016	Haleakala	Pan-STARRS 1	·	1.1 km	MPC; JPL
869588	2016 QS_{127}	—	August 28, 2016	Mount Lemmon	Mount Lemmon Survey	·	1.1 km	MPC; JPL
869589	2016 QK_{129}	—	August 27, 2016	Haleakala	Pan-STARRS 1	·	1.2 km	MPC; JPL
869590	2016 QL_{131}	—	August 26, 2016	Haleakala	Pan-STARRS 1	·	1.7 km	MPC; JPL
869591	2016 QZ_{135}	—	August 30, 2016	Mount Lemmon	Mount Lemmon Survey	WAT	1.5 km	MPC; JPL
869592	2016 QO_{138}	—	September 15, 2007	Kitt Peak	Spacewatch	·	1.2 km	MPC; JPL
869593	2016 QR_{138}	—	August 28, 2016	Mount Lemmon	Mount Lemmon Survey	·	1.3 km	MPC; JPL
869594	2016 QF_{139}	—	August 30, 2016	Haleakala	Pan-STARRS 1	·	1.3 km	MPC; JPL
869595	2016 QJ_{141}	—	October 19, 2007	Catalina	CSS	·	1.6 km	MPC; JPL
869596	2016 QT_{141}	—	August 28, 2016	Mount Lemmon	Mount Lemmon Survey	·	1.2 km	MPC; JPL
869597	2016 QW_{141}	—	August 29, 2016	Mount Lemmon	Mount Lemmon Survey	·	1.1 km	MPC; JPL
869598	2016 QZ_{141}	—	August 27, 2016	Haleakala	Pan-STARRS 1	·	1.3 km	MPC; JPL
869599	2016 QR_{143}	—	October 12, 1998	Kitt Peak	Spacewatch	·	1.6 km	MPC; JPL
869600	2016 QA_{144}	—	August 27, 2016	Haleakala	Pan-STARRS 1	HNS	730 m	MPC; JPL

== 869601–869700 ==
back to top

Designation			Discovery			Properties		Ref
Permanent	Provisional	Named after	Date	Site	Discoverer(s)	Category	Diam.	Ref
869601	2016 QC_{144}	—	August 26, 2016	Haleakala	Pan-STARRS 1	·	1.1 km	MPC; JPL
869602	2016 QE_{144}	—	August 30, 2016	Mount Lemmon	Mount Lemmon Survey	·	1.5 km	MPC; JPL
869603	2016 QS_{144}	—	August 30, 2016	Haleakala	Pan-STARRS 1	WIT	640 m	MPC; JPL
869604	2016 QW_{145}	—	August 28, 2016	Mount Lemmon	Mount Lemmon Survey	·	1.6 km	MPC; JPL
869605	2016 QS_{147}	—	August 28, 2016	Mount Lemmon	Mount Lemmon Survey	·	1.0 km	MPC; JPL
869606	2016 QZ_{147}	—	January 21, 2015	Haleakala	Pan-STARRS 1	·	650 m	MPC; JPL
869607	2016 QO_{150}	—	August 26, 2016	Haleakala	Pan-STARRS 1	EOS	1.4 km	MPC; JPL
869608	2016 QY_{155}	—	October 14, 2023	Haleakala	Pan-STARRS 2	·	1.8 km	MPC; JPL
869609	2016 QH_{159}	—	October 18, 2003	Palomar	NEAT	·	1.0 km	MPC; JPL
869610	2016 QK_{160}	—	August 30, 2016	Mount Lemmon	Mount Lemmon Survey	H	440 m	MPC; JPL
869611	2016 QB_{165}	—	August 30, 2016	Mount Lemmon	Mount Lemmon Survey	·	1.2 km	MPC; JPL
869612	2016 RE_{2}	—	December 23, 2012	Haleakala	Pan-STARRS 1	·	1.7 km	MPC; JPL
869613	2016 RD_{4}	—	July 11, 2016	Haleakala	Pan-STARRS 1	·	1.2 km	MPC; JPL
869614	2016 RA_{7}	—	August 24, 2012	Kitt Peak	Spacewatch	·	810 m	MPC; JPL
869615	2016 RC_{7}	—	August 25, 2011	Mayhill-ISON	L. Elenin	·	1.4 km	MPC; JPL
869616	2016 RZ_{7}	—	October 7, 2012	Haleakala	Pan-STARRS 1	EUN	900 m	MPC; JPL
869617	2016 RG_{8}	—	October 9, 2012	Mount Lemmon	Mount Lemmon Survey	·	1.0 km	MPC; JPL
869618	2016 RQ_{9}	—	October 10, 2012	Mount Lemmon	Mount Lemmon Survey	·	1.2 km	MPC; JPL
869619	2016 RN_{10}	—	August 29, 2016	Mount Lemmon	Mount Lemmon Survey	·	1.1 km	MPC; JPL
869620	2016 RY_{13}	—	August 14, 2016	Haleakala	Pan-STARRS 1	·	500 m	MPC; JPL
869621	2016 RR_{16}	—	December 31, 2013	Haleakala	Pan-STARRS 1	V	450 m	MPC; JPL
869622	2016 RY_{16}	—	November 3, 2011	Mount Lemmon	Mount Lemmon Survey	·	1.8 km	MPC; JPL
869623	2016 RA_{17}	—	September 5, 2016	Mount Lemmon	Mount Lemmon Survey	·	2.1 km	MPC; JPL
869624	2016 RS_{21}	—	August 3, 2016	Haleakala	Pan-STARRS 1	·	860 m	MPC; JPL
869625	2016 RF_{22}	—	September 21, 2003	Kitt Peak	Spacewatch	·	1.0 km	MPC; JPL
869626	2016 RQ_{22}	—	August 31, 2005	Kitt Peak	Spacewatch	·	830 m	MPC; JPL
869627	2016 RL_{23}	—	November 1, 2006	Mount Lemmon	Mount Lemmon Survey	EOS	1.2 km	MPC; JPL
869628	2016 RV_{24}	—	September 6, 2016	Mount Lemmon	Mount Lemmon Survey	·	1.1 km	MPC; JPL
869629	2016 RV_{25}	—	October 23, 2011	Haleakala	Pan-STARRS 1	·	2.3 km	MPC; JPL
869630	2016 RB_{26}	—	October 2, 2013	Kitt Peak	Spacewatch	·	500 m	MPC; JPL
869631	2016 RY_{27}	—	November 19, 2008	Kitt Peak	Spacewatch	HNS	860 m	MPC; JPL
869632	2016 RK_{29}	—	September 18, 2011	Mount Lemmon	Mount Lemmon Survey	H	370 m	MPC; JPL
869633	2016 RL_{29}	—	October 1, 2005	Kitt Peak	Spacewatch	·	2.2 km	MPC; JPL
869634	2016 RC_{30}	—	September 26, 1995	Kitt Peak	Spacewatch	·	920 m	MPC; JPL
869635	2016 RC_{31}	—	September 10, 2016	Mount Lemmon	Mount Lemmon Survey	EUN	850 m	MPC; JPL
869636	2016 RE_{33}	—	October 15, 2007	Mount Lemmon	Mount Lemmon Survey	·	1.5 km	MPC; JPL
869637	2016 RN_{35}	—	September 14, 2005	Kitt Peak	Spacewatch	·	810 m	MPC; JPL
869638	2016 RW_{35}	—	September 22, 2003	Kitt Peak	Spacewatch	·	1.4 km	MPC; JPL
869639	2016 RS_{36}	—	April 21, 2012	Mount Lemmon	Mount Lemmon Survey	·	640 m	MPC; JPL
869640	2016 RD_{38}	—	February 26, 2014	Haleakala	Pan-STARRS 1	·	1.3 km	MPC; JPL
869641	2016 RR_{40}	—	September 10, 2016	Mount Lemmon	Mount Lemmon Survey	H	350 m	MPC; JPL
869642	2016 RV_{41}	—	September 28, 1998	Kitt Peak	Spacewatch	·	1.1 km	MPC; JPL
869643	2016 RG_{43}	—	September 24, 2005	Kitt Peak	Spacewatch	TIR	2.1 km	MPC; JPL
869644	2016 RH_{44}	—	September 12, 2016	Mount Lemmon	Mount Lemmon Survey	·	1.4 km	MPC; JPL
869645	2016 RQ_{48}	—	October 23, 2011	Haleakala	Pan-STARRS 1	·	2.0 km	MPC; JPL
869646	2016 RD_{49}	—	October 13, 2007	Kitt Peak	Spacewatch	AGN	800 m	MPC; JPL
869647	2016 RH_{50}	—	September 2, 2010	Mount Lemmon	Mount Lemmon Survey	·	2.2 km	MPC; JPL
869648	2016 RT_{50}	—	September 5, 2016	Mount Lemmon	Mount Lemmon Survey	·	2.1 km	MPC; JPL
869649	2016 RW_{50}	—	September 6, 2016	Haleakala	Pan-STARRS 1	H	400 m	MPC; JPL
869650	2016 RQ_{51}	—	September 5, 2016	Mount Lemmon	Mount Lemmon Survey	·	1.2 km	MPC; JPL
869651	2016 RW_{51}	—	September 6, 2016	Mount Lemmon	Mount Lemmon Survey	·	540 m	MPC; JPL
869652	2016 RZ_{51}	—	September 5, 2016	Mount Lemmon	Mount Lemmon Survey	·	1.4 km	MPC; JPL
869653	2016 RG_{52}	—	September 8, 2016	Haleakala	Pan-STARRS 1	·	1.5 km	MPC; JPL
869654	2016 RM_{52}	—	September 2, 2016	Mount Lemmon	Mount Lemmon Survey	·	860 m	MPC; JPL
869655	2016 RG_{54}	—	September 4, 2016	Mount Lemmon	Mount Lemmon Survey	MAR	840 m	MPC; JPL
869656	2016 RH_{54}	—	September 4, 2016	Mount Lemmon	Mount Lemmon Survey	JUN	720 m	MPC; JPL
869657	2016 RT_{55}	—	September 4, 2016	Mount Lemmon	Mount Lemmon Survey	·	1.8 km	MPC; JPL
869658	2016 RK_{57}	—	September 8, 2016	Haleakala	Pan-STARRS 1	·	700 m	MPC; JPL
869659	2016 RV_{57}	—	September 8, 2016	Haleakala	Pan-STARRS 1	·	1.7 km	MPC; JPL
869660	2016 RM_{60}	—	September 5, 2016	Mount Lemmon	Mount Lemmon Survey	·	1.3 km	MPC; JPL
869661	2016 RS_{61}	—	September 8, 2016	Haleakala	Pan-STARRS 1	·	1.4 km	MPC; JPL
869662	2016 RF_{63}	—	September 6, 2016	Mount Lemmon	Mount Lemmon Survey	·	1.0 km	MPC; JPL
869663	2016 RO_{64}	—	September 4, 2016	Mount Lemmon	Mount Lemmon Survey	EUN	790 m	MPC; JPL
869664	2016 RO_{65}	—	September 6, 2016	Mount Lemmon	Mount Lemmon Survey	·	1.3 km	MPC; JPL
869665	2016 RQ_{65}	—	September 4, 2016	Mount Lemmon	Mount Lemmon Survey	EUP	2.6 km	MPC; JPL
869666	2016 RZ_{65}	—	September 12, 2016	Haleakala	Pan-STARRS 1	·	2.0 km	MPC; JPL
869667	2016 RX_{66}	—	September 4, 2016	Mount Lemmon	Mount Lemmon Survey	·	1.6 km	MPC; JPL
869668	2016 RB_{67}	—	September 12, 2016	Mount Lemmon	Mount Lemmon Survey	·	1.1 km	MPC; JPL
869669	2016 RQ_{67}	—	September 8, 2016	Haleakala	Pan-STARRS 1	·	820 m	MPC; JPL
869670	2016 RR_{67}	—	September 10, 2016	Mount Lemmon	Mount Lemmon Survey	·	1.8 km	MPC; JPL
869671	2016 RU_{68}	—	September 4, 2016	Mount Lemmon	Mount Lemmon Survey	HNS	960 m	MPC; JPL
869672	2016 RB_{70}	—	September 8, 2016	Haleakala	Pan-STARRS 1	·	890 m	MPC; JPL
869673	2016 RD_{70}	—	September 8, 2016	Haleakala	Pan-STARRS 1	·	1.1 km	MPC; JPL
869674	2016 RB_{71}	—	September 12, 2016	Mount Lemmon	Mount Lemmon Survey	·	1.5 km	MPC; JPL
869675	2016 RL_{71}	—	September 10, 2016	Mount Lemmon	Mount Lemmon Survey	·	720 m	MPC; JPL
869676	2016 RE_{72}	—	September 10, 2016	Mount Lemmon	Mount Lemmon Survey	·	820 m	MPC; JPL
869677	2016 RK_{72}	—	September 8, 2016	Haleakala	Pan-STARRS 1	·	670 m	MPC; JPL
869678	2016 RX_{72}	—	September 12, 2016	Mount Lemmon	Mount Lemmon Survey	·	760 m	MPC; JPL
869679	2016 RA_{74}	—	September 3, 2016	Mount Lemmon	Mount Lemmon Survey	·	640 m	MPC; JPL
869680	2016 RQ_{74}	—	September 12, 2016	Haleakala	Pan-STARRS 1	·	1.0 km	MPC; JPL
869681	2016 RC_{77}	—	September 12, 2016	Mount Lemmon	Mount Lemmon Survey	·	1.2 km	MPC; JPL
869682	2016 RE_{78}	—	September 8, 2016	Haleakala	Pan-STARRS 1	HNS	770 m	MPC; JPL
869683	2016 RR_{80}	—	September 12, 2016	Haleakala	Pan-STARRS 1	·	1.8 km	MPC; JPL
869684	2016 RQ_{83}	—	September 6, 2016	Mount Lemmon	Mount Lemmon Survey	·	1.4 km	MPC; JPL
869685	2016 RV_{86}	—	August 10, 2007	Kitt Peak	Spacewatch	·	1.1 km	MPC; JPL
869686	2016 RP_{89}	—	October 29, 2003	Anderson Mesa	LONEOS	·	1.4 km	MPC; JPL
869687	2016 RO_{95}	—	September 2, 2016	Mount Lemmon	Mount Lemmon Survey	·	990 m	MPC; JPL
869688	2016 SO	—	April 20, 2009	Mount Lemmon	Mount Lemmon Survey	·	650 m	MPC; JPL
869689	2016 SC_{1}	—	November 15, 2006	Mount Lemmon	Mount Lemmon Survey	·	1.6 km	MPC; JPL
869690	2016 SK_{4}	—	June 16, 2016	Haleakala	Pan-STARRS 1	EUN	900 m	MPC; JPL
869691	2016 SZ_{8}	—	October 20, 2012	Kitt Peak	Spacewatch	·	1.2 km	MPC; JPL
869692	2016 SV_{9}	—	January 23, 2015	Haleakala	Pan-STARRS 1	H	400 m	MPC; JPL
869693	2016 SL_{11}	—	September 25, 2012	Mount Lemmon	Mount Lemmon Survey	·	880 m	MPC; JPL
869694	2016 SG_{12}	—	April 10, 2015	Mount Lemmon	Mount Lemmon Survey	H	410 m	MPC; JPL
869695	2016 SG_{13}	—	August 17, 2009	Kitt Peak	Spacewatch	NYS	560 m	MPC; JPL
869696	2016 SA_{14}	—	August 30, 2016	Mount Lemmon	Mount Lemmon Survey	·	1.1 km	MPC; JPL
869697	2016 SW_{15}	—	September 16, 2003	Kitt Peak	Spacewatch	·	1.1 km	MPC; JPL
869698	2016 SA_{16}	—	October 12, 2009	Mount Lemmon	Mount Lemmon Survey	·	750 m	MPC; JPL
869699	2016 SM_{18}	—	September 20, 2003	Kitt Peak	Spacewatch	·	470 m	MPC; JPL
869700	2016 SD_{21}	—	August 2, 2016	Haleakala	Pan-STARRS 1	·	2.6 km	MPC; JPL

== 869701–869800 ==
back to top

Designation			Discovery			Properties		Ref
Permanent	Provisional	Named after	Date	Site	Discoverer(s)	Category	Diam.	Ref
869701	2016 SY_{22}	—	September 13, 2007	Mount Lemmon	Mount Lemmon Survey	·	940 m	MPC; JPL
869702	2016 SW_{23}	—	September 14, 2007	Mount Lemmon	Mount Lemmon Survey	·	1.4 km	MPC; JPL
869703	2016 SZ_{23}	—	September 10, 2007	Mount Lemmon	Mount Lemmon Survey	·	1.1 km	MPC; JPL
869704	2016 SB_{26}	—	August 30, 2006	Anderson Mesa	LONEOS	·	570 m	MPC; JPL
869705	2016 SO_{26}	—	October 20, 2012	Mount Lemmon	Mount Lemmon Survey	·	1.3 km	MPC; JPL
869706	2016 SH_{27}	—	March 17, 2015	Mount Lemmon	Mount Lemmon Survey	(116763)	1.1 km	MPC; JPL
869707	2016 SC_{28}	—	August 4, 2016	Haleakala	Pan-STARRS 1	·	1.1 km	MPC; JPL
869708	2016 SV_{31}	—	October 23, 2011	Haleakala	Pan-STARRS 1	·	1.6 km	MPC; JPL
869709	2016 SW_{32}	—	February 8, 2011	Mount Lemmon	Mount Lemmon Survey	·	440 m	MPC; JPL
869710	2016 SH_{33}	—	August 2, 2016	Haleakala	Pan-STARRS 1	·	480 m	MPC; JPL
869711	2016 SB_{35}	—	September 20, 2003	Palomar	NEAT	(1547)	1.0 km	MPC; JPL
869712	2016 SU_{36}	—	September 16, 2003	Kitt Peak	Spacewatch	·	1.2 km	MPC; JPL
869713	2016 SY_{36}	—	August 2, 2016	Haleakala	Pan-STARRS 1	·	1.8 km	MPC; JPL
869714	2016 SG_{38}	—	September 30, 2006	Mount Lemmon	Mount Lemmon Survey	·	510 m	MPC; JPL
869715	2016 SK_{39}	—	October 6, 2005	Mount Lemmon	Mount Lemmon Survey	·	2.1 km	MPC; JPL
869716	2016 SX_{39}	—	September 14, 2006	Kitt Peak	Spacewatch	·	990 m	MPC; JPL
869717	2016 SE_{42}	—	February 16, 2015	Haleakala	Pan-STARRS 1	·	600 m	MPC; JPL
869718	2016 SY_{42}	—	August 2, 2016	Haleakala	Pan-STARRS 1	·	470 m	MPC; JPL
869719	2016 SU_{44}	—	October 4, 1999	Kitt Peak	Spacewatch	EUN	950 m	MPC; JPL
869720	2016 SC_{45}	—	September 30, 2016	Haleakala	Pan-STARRS 1	·	1.4 km	MPC; JPL
869721	2016 SV_{45}	—	September 25, 2009	Kitt Peak	Spacewatch	·	700 m	MPC; JPL
869722	2016 SL_{46}	—	July 11, 2016	Haleakala	Pan-STARRS 1	·	1.1 km	MPC; JPL
869723	2016 SG_{47}	—	September 19, 2007	Kitt Peak	Spacewatch	·	1.2 km	MPC; JPL
869724	2016 SA_{48}	—	October 4, 2007	Kitt Peak	Spacewatch	·	1.3 km	MPC; JPL
869725	2016 SV_{51}	—	May 21, 2015	Haleakala	Pan-STARRS 1	·	1.3 km	MPC; JPL
869726	2016 SE_{54}	—	May 21, 2015	Haleakala	Pan-STARRS 1	·	1.2 km	MPC; JPL
869727	2016 SN_{64}	—	September 25, 2016	Mount Lemmon	Mount Lemmon Survey	·	1.3 km	MPC; JPL
869728	2016 SN_{65}	—	September 11, 2016	Mount Lemmon	Mount Lemmon Survey	·	1.3 km	MPC; JPL
869729	2016 SB_{66}	—	October 24, 2009	Kitt Peak	Spacewatch	·	600 m	MPC; JPL
869730	2016 SK_{66}	—	September 26, 2016	Mount Lemmon	Mount Lemmon Survey	·	1.5 km	MPC; JPL
869731	2016 SW_{68}	—	April 10, 2005	Kitt Peak	Spacewatch	·	1.8 km	MPC; JPL
869732	2016 SY_{68}	—	September 27, 2016	Haleakala	Pan-STARRS 1	·	1.1 km	MPC; JPL
869733	2016 SB_{70}	—	September 25, 2016	Haleakala	Pan-STARRS 1	·	1.1 km	MPC; JPL
869734	2016 SD_{70}	—	October 9, 2007	Mount Lemmon	Mount Lemmon Survey	·	1.1 km	MPC; JPL
869735	2016 SJ_{71}	—	September 22, 2016	Haleakala	Pan-STARRS 1	HNS	990 m	MPC; JPL
869736	2016 SN_{71}	—	September 25, 2016	Haleakala	Pan-STARRS 1	·	1.4 km	MPC; JPL
869737	2016 SP_{72}	—	September 27, 2016	Mount Lemmon	Mount Lemmon Survey	·	1.5 km	MPC; JPL
869738	2016 SM_{73}	—	September 25, 2016	Haleakala	Pan-STARRS 1	·	1.4 km	MPC; JPL
869739	2016 SD_{74}	—	September 26, 2016	Haleakala	Pan-STARRS 1	·	1.2 km	MPC; JPL
869740	2016 SN_{74}	—	September 25, 2016	Haleakala	Pan-STARRS 1	·	1.4 km	MPC; JPL
869741	2016 SS_{74}	—	September 27, 2016	Haleakala	Pan-STARRS 1	·	1.3 km	MPC; JPL
869742	2016 SN_{76}	—	August 24, 2011	Haleakala	Pan-STARRS 1	·	1.4 km	MPC; JPL
869743	2016 SQ_{76}	—	September 25, 2016	Haleakala	Pan-STARRS 1	·	1.2 km	MPC; JPL
869744	2016 SX_{77}	—	September 27, 2016	Mount Lemmon	Mount Lemmon Survey	·	2.2 km	MPC; JPL
869745	2016 SY_{77}	—	September 25, 2016	Mount Lemmon	Mount Lemmon Survey	·	1.1 km	MPC; JPL
869746	2016 SK_{78}	—	September 25, 2016	Haleakala	Pan-STARRS 1	·	1.2 km	MPC; JPL
869747	2016 SA_{79}	—	September 22, 2016	Mount Lemmon	Mount Lemmon Survey	·	1.6 km	MPC; JPL
869748	2016 SL_{79}	—	September 27, 2016	Mount Lemmon	Mount Lemmon Survey	NEM	1.6 km	MPC; JPL
869749	2016 SV_{79}	—	September 25, 2016	Haleakala	Pan-STARRS 1	·	1.3 km	MPC; JPL
869750	2016 SO_{80}	—	September 26, 2016	Haleakala	Pan-STARRS 1	·	2.3 km	MPC; JPL
869751	2016 SX_{80}	—	September 27, 2016	Haleakala	Pan-STARRS 1	·	1.4 km	MPC; JPL
869752	2016 SD_{81}	—	September 25, 2016	Haleakala	Pan-STARRS 1	·	1 km	MPC; JPL
869753	2016 SE_{81}	—	September 25, 2016	Mount Lemmon	Mount Lemmon Survey	HOF	1.7 km	MPC; JPL
869754	2016 SS_{81}	—	September 30, 2016	Haleakala	Pan-STARRS 1	·	1.6 km	MPC; JPL
869755	2016 SH_{84}	—	September 26, 2016	Haleakala	Pan-STARRS 1	·	1.2 km	MPC; JPL
869756	2016 SU_{87}	—	January 17, 2013	Haleakala	Pan-STARRS 1	·	940 m	MPC; JPL
869757	2016 SQ_{88}	—	September 25, 2016	Mount Lemmon	Mount Lemmon Survey	·	1.2 km	MPC; JPL
869758	2016 SQ_{90}	—	September 25, 2016	Haleakala	Pan-STARRS 1	·	950 m	MPC; JPL
869759	2016 SR_{90}	—	September 30, 2016	Haleakala	Pan-STARRS 1	·	660 m	MPC; JPL
869760	2016 SE_{91}	—	September 22, 2016	Mount Lemmon	Mount Lemmon Survey	·	1.5 km	MPC; JPL
869761	2016 SC_{95}	—	September 30, 2016	Haleakala	Pan-STARRS 1	·	1.3 km	MPC; JPL
869762	2016 SV_{95}	—	September 25, 2016	Mount Lemmon	Mount Lemmon Survey	·	1.5 km	MPC; JPL
869763	2016 SD_{96}	—	September 26, 2016	Mount Lemmon	Mount Lemmon Survey	·	1.3 km	MPC; JPL
869764	2016 SS_{97}	—	September 27, 2016	Haleakala	Pan-STARRS 1	·	490 m	MPC; JPL
869765	2016 SA_{98}	—	September 25, 2016	Haleakala	Pan-STARRS 1	·	570 m	MPC; JPL
869766	2016 SQ_{99}	—	September 27, 2016	Haleakala	Pan-STARRS 1	·	600 m	MPC; JPL
869767	2016 SD_{101}	—	September 25, 2016	Haleakala	Pan-STARRS 1	·	2.1 km	MPC; JPL
869768	2016 SK_{101}	—	September 25, 2016	Mount Lemmon	Mount Lemmon Survey	·	1.3 km	MPC; JPL
869769	2016 SQ_{101}	—	September 25, 2016	Haleakala	Pan-STARRS 1	·	2.4 km	MPC; JPL
869770	2016 SF_{102}	—	September 26, 2016	Haleakala	Pan-STARRS 1	VER	1.8 km	MPC; JPL
869771	2016 SH_{106}	—	September 25, 2016	Mount Lemmon	Mount Lemmon Survey	·	1.2 km	MPC; JPL
869772	2016 SQ_{107}	—	September 22, 2016	Mount Lemmon	Mount Lemmon Survey	·	2.3 km	MPC; JPL
869773	2016 SP_{109}	—	September 26, 2016	Haleakala	Pan-STARRS 1	·	1.7 km	MPC; JPL
869774	2016 SB_{110}	—	September 22, 2016	Mount Lemmon	Mount Lemmon Survey	·	1.6 km	MPC; JPL
869775	2016 SD_{110}	—	September 26, 2016	Haleakala	Pan-STARRS 1	·	1.3 km	MPC; JPL
869776	2016 SF_{110}	—	September 30, 2016	Haleakala	Pan-STARRS 1	·	1.3 km	MPC; JPL
869777	2016 SA_{111}	—	September 22, 2016	Mount Lemmon	Mount Lemmon Survey	AGN	730 m	MPC; JPL
869778	2016 SL_{112}	—	September 25, 2016	Haleakala	Pan-STARRS 1	·	1.8 km	MPC; JPL
869779	2016 SZ_{112}	—	February 13, 2012	Haleakala	Pan-STARRS 1	H	520 m	MPC; JPL
869780	2016 SG_{115}	—	September 25, 2016	Haleakala	Pan-STARRS 1	HNS	810 m	MPC; JPL
869781	2016 SW_{115}	—	September 25, 2016	Haleakala	Pan-STARRS 1	·	1.7 km	MPC; JPL
869782	2016 TC_{3}	—	August 31, 2005	Anderson Mesa	LONEOS	·	910 m	MPC; JPL
869783	2016 TJ_{4}	—	September 14, 2007	Mount Lemmon	Mount Lemmon Survey	·	1.2 km	MPC; JPL
869784	2016 TG_{7}	—	October 22, 2003	Kitt Peak	Deep Ecliptic Survey	·	1.3 km	MPC; JPL
869785	2016 TV_{11}	—	October 9, 2007	Kitt Peak	Spacewatch	·	1.4 km	MPC; JPL
869786	2016 TG_{12}	—	October 2, 2016	Mount Lemmon	Mount Lemmon Survey	·	1.9 km	MPC; JPL
869787	2016 TO_{12}	—	August 28, 2003	Palomar	NEAT	·	1.3 km	MPC; JPL
869788	2016 TB_{13}	—	October 3, 2016	XuYi	PMO NEO Survey Program	PHO	670 m	MPC; JPL
869789	2016 TJ_{13}	—	August 31, 2005	Kitt Peak	Spacewatch	·	720 m	MPC; JPL
869790	2016 TG_{17}	—	October 6, 2016	Haleakala	Pan-STARRS 1	·	1.2 km	MPC; JPL
869791	2016 TR_{17}	—	October 7, 2016	Mount Lemmon	Mount Lemmon Survey	·	670 m	MPC; JPL
869792	2016 TR_{22}	—	September 12, 2016	Haleakala	Pan-STARRS 1	·	1.1 km	MPC; JPL
869793	2016 TC_{24}	—	November 3, 2011	Mount Lemmon	Mount Lemmon Survey	EOS	1.5 km	MPC; JPL
869794	2016 TL_{24}	—	December 24, 2005	Socorro	LINEAR	·	2.4 km	MPC; JPL
869795	2016 TN_{27}	—	July 9, 2005	Kitt Peak	Spacewatch	V	480 m	MPC; JPL
869796	2016 TY_{27}	—	July 30, 2016	Haleakala	Pan-STARRS 1	·	920 m	MPC; JPL
869797	2016 TB_{28}	—	August 27, 2016	Haleakala	Pan-STARRS 1	·	1.1 km	MPC; JPL
869798	2016 TV_{28}	—	October 5, 2016	Mount Lemmon	Mount Lemmon Survey	·	2.2 km	MPC; JPL
869799	2016 TN_{30}	—	October 17, 2003	Kitt Peak	Spacewatch	·	1.1 km	MPC; JPL
869800	2016 TY_{32}	—	January 5, 2013	Mount Lemmon	Mount Lemmon Survey	ADE	1.8 km	MPC; JPL

== 869801–869900 ==
back to top

Designation			Discovery			Properties		Ref
Permanent	Provisional	Named after	Date	Site	Discoverer(s)	Category	Diam.	Ref
869801	2016 TH_{33}	—	August 23, 2007	Kitt Peak	Spacewatch	EUN	830 m	MPC; JPL
869802	2016 TR_{33}	—	October 17, 2006	Mount Lemmon	Mount Lemmon Survey	PHO	520 m	MPC; JPL
869803	2016 TO_{35}	—	January 10, 2011	Mount Lemmon	Mount Lemmon Survey	·	550 m	MPC; JPL
869804	2016 TN_{36}	—	August 24, 2007	Kitt Peak	Spacewatch	·	1.2 km	MPC; JPL
869805	2016 TV_{37}	—	November 14, 2013	Mount Lemmon	Mount Lemmon Survey	·	510 m	MPC; JPL
869806	2016 TJ_{38}	—	August 10, 2016	Haleakala	Pan-STARRS 1	·	1.2 km	MPC; JPL
869807	2016 TB_{39}	—	October 26, 2011	Haleakala	Pan-STARRS 1	(21885)	1.6 km	MPC; JPL
869808	2016 TL_{40}	—	October 21, 2006	Kitt Peak	Spacewatch	·	520 m	MPC; JPL
869809	2016 TM_{45}	—	September 10, 2016	Mount Lemmon	Mount Lemmon Survey	·	1 km	MPC; JPL
869810	2016 TB_{46}	—	November 22, 2009	Kitt Peak	Spacewatch	·	590 m	MPC; JPL
869811	2016 TG_{49}	—	October 7, 2016	Haleakala	Pan-STARRS 1	·	1.5 km	MPC; JPL
869812	2016 TL_{55}	—	October 9, 2016	Haleakala	Pan-STARRS 1	·	1.1 km	MPC; JPL
869813	2016 TT_{57}	—	August 30, 2016	Mount Lemmon	Mount Lemmon Survey	·	1.8 km	MPC; JPL
869814	2016 TZ_{58}	—	February 25, 2007	Kitt Peak	Spacewatch	·	880 m	MPC; JPL
869815	2016 TH_{59}	—	August 30, 2016	Mount Lemmon	Mount Lemmon Survey	·	1.3 km	MPC; JPL
869816	2016 TG_{61}	—	August 27, 2016	Haleakala	Pan-STARRS 1	·	1.3 km	MPC; JPL
869817	2016 TN_{65}	—	December 1, 2003	Kitt Peak	Spacewatch	·	1.1 km	MPC; JPL
869818	2016 TJ_{68}	—	October 25, 2013	Mount Lemmon	Mount Lemmon Survey	·	500 m	MPC; JPL
869819	2016 TO_{69}	—	September 8, 2010	Westfield	International Astronomical Search Collaboration	·	2.1 km	MPC; JPL
869820	2016 TL_{70}	—	September 25, 2006	Mount Lemmon	Mount Lemmon Survey	·	570 m	MPC; JPL
869821	2016 TS_{70}	—	November 7, 2007	Kitt Peak	Spacewatch	·	1.4 km	MPC; JPL
869822	2016 TJ_{72}	—	November 10, 2013	Mount Lemmon	Mount Lemmon Survey	·	490 m	MPC; JPL
869823	2016 TP_{74}	—	September 25, 2016	Mount Lemmon	Mount Lemmon Survey	T_{j} (2.96) · 3:2	3.8 km	MPC; JPL
869824	2016 TW_{74}	—	September 12, 2007	Kitt Peak	Spacewatch	·	1.2 km	MPC; JPL
869825	2016 TU_{75}	—	July 28, 2011	Haleakala	Pan-STARRS 1	GEF	840 m	MPC; JPL
869826	2016 TC_{78}	—	September 22, 2003	Anderson Mesa	LONEOS	·	1.2 km	MPC; JPL
869827	2016 TZ_{78}	—	October 10, 2016	Mount Lemmon	Mount Lemmon Survey	·	2.0 km	MPC; JPL
869828	2016 TP_{79}	—	December 23, 2012	Haleakala	Pan-STARRS 1	GEF	870 m	MPC; JPL
869829	2016 TL_{81}	—	February 10, 2014	Haleakala	Pan-STARRS 1	·	690 m	MPC; JPL
869830	2016 TV_{82}	—	September 27, 2011	Mount Lemmon	Mount Lemmon Survey	·	1.9 km	MPC; JPL
869831	2016 TP_{84}	—	October 10, 2016	Haleakala	Pan-STARRS 1	EUN	960 m	MPC; JPL
869832	2016 TW_{89}	—	September 20, 2003	Anderson Mesa	LONEOS	·	1.2 km	MPC; JPL
869833	2016 TE_{92}	—	December 27, 2011	Mount Lemmon	Mount Lemmon Survey	(895)	2.7 km	MPC; JPL
869834	2016 TG_{92}	—	September 4, 2016	Mount Lemmon	Mount Lemmon Survey	·	1.0 km	MPC; JPL
869835	2016 TJ_{92}	—	July 27, 2011	Haleakala	Pan-STARRS 1	·	1.5 km	MPC; JPL
869836	2016 TR_{95}	—	March 30, 2008	Kitt Peak	Spacewatch	H	300 m	MPC; JPL
869837	2016 TU_{95}	—	October 9, 2007	Kitt Peak	Spacewatch	·	1.4 km	MPC; JPL
869838	2016 TP_{97}	—	December 23, 2012	Haleakala	Pan-STARRS 1	·	960 m	MPC; JPL
869839	2016 TC_{98}	—	December 23, 2012	Haleakala	Pan-STARRS 1	·	1.5 km	MPC; JPL
869840	2016 TX_{99}	—	December 23, 2012	Haleakala	Pan-STARRS 1	·	1.5 km	MPC; JPL
869841	2016 TF_{100}	—	January 10, 2013	Kitt Peak	Spacewatch	ADE	1.3 km	MPC; JPL
869842	2016 TZ_{100}	—	October 10, 2016	Mount Lemmon	Mount Lemmon Survey	·	1.3 km	MPC; JPL
869843	2016 TF_{101}	—	October 1, 2016	Oukaïmeden	C. Rinner	·	730 m	MPC; JPL
869844	2016 TM_{101}	—	October 6, 2016	Mount Lemmon	Mount Lemmon Survey	H	380 m	MPC; JPL
869845	2016 TZ_{101}	—	October 10, 2016	Haleakala	Pan-STARRS 1	·	1.5 km	MPC; JPL
869846	2016 TN_{103}	—	October 12, 2016	Haleakala	Pan-STARRS 1	T_{j} (2.92)	2.8 km	MPC; JPL
869847	2016 TS_{103}	—	October 8, 2016	Haleakala	Pan-STARRS 1	·	1.6 km	MPC; JPL
869848	2016 TZ_{103}	—	December 14, 2012	Calar Alto	S. Mottola, S. Hellmich	·	1.3 km	MPC; JPL
869849	2016 TV_{104}	—	October 8, 2016	Haleakala	Pan-STARRS 1	·	1.2 km	MPC; JPL
869850	2016 TD_{105}	—	October 2, 2016	Mount Lemmon	Mount Lemmon Survey	·	1.2 km	MPC; JPL
869851	2016 TG_{105}	—	October 13, 2016	Mount Lemmon	Mount Lemmon Survey	·	690 m	MPC; JPL
869852	2016 TL_{106}	—	October 13, 2016	Haleakala	Pan-STARRS 1	·	500 m	MPC; JPL
869853	2016 TO_{106}	—	October 7, 2016	Mount Lemmon	Mount Lemmon Survey	·	1.2 km	MPC; JPL
869854	2016 TU_{106}	—	October 12, 2016	Mount Lemmon	Mount Lemmon Survey	EUN	980 m	MPC; JPL
869855	2016 TA_{108}	—	October 13, 2016	Haleakala	Pan-STARRS 1	·	740 m	MPC; JPL
869856	2016 TC_{108}	—	October 5, 2016	Mount Lemmon	Mount Lemmon Survey	GEF	720 m	MPC; JPL
869857	2016 TB_{110}	—	October 10, 2016	Mount Lemmon	Mount Lemmon Survey	·	1.3 km	MPC; JPL
869858	2016 TU_{110}	—	October 7, 2016	Haleakala	Pan-STARRS 1	·	1.1 km	MPC; JPL
869859	2016 TD_{111}	—	June 17, 2005	Mount Lemmon	Mount Lemmon Survey	·	630 m	MPC; JPL
869860	2016 TA_{112}	—	October 1, 2016	Mount Lemmon	Mount Lemmon Survey	·	1.1 km	MPC; JPL
869861	2016 TV_{112}	—	October 8, 2016	Haleakala	Pan-STARRS 1	H	370 m	MPC; JPL
869862	2016 TA_{114}	—	October 8, 2016	Haleakala	Pan-STARRS 1	·	1.5 km	MPC; JPL
869863	2016 TF_{115}	—	October 12, 2016	Haleakala	Pan-STARRS 1	·	1.1 km	MPC; JPL
869864	2016 TK_{116}	—	October 7, 2016	Haleakala	Pan-STARRS 1	·	630 m	MPC; JPL
869865	2016 TZ_{116}	—	October 2, 2016	Mount Lemmon	Mount Lemmon Survey	·	960 m	MPC; JPL
869866	2016 TE_{117}	—	October 6, 2016	Haleakala	Pan-STARRS 1	·	1.5 km	MPC; JPL
869867	2016 TJ_{118}	—	October 7, 2016	Haleakala	Pan-STARRS 1	H	310 m	MPC; JPL
869868	2016 TZ_{119}	—	October 13, 2016	Haleakala	Pan-STARRS 1	·	1.6 km	MPC; JPL
869869	2016 TC_{120}	—	October 9, 2016	Haleakala	Pan-STARRS 1	·	1.4 km	MPC; JPL
869870	2016 TV_{121}	—	October 2, 2016	Mount Lemmon	Mount Lemmon Survey	·	500 m	MPC; JPL
869871	2016 TZ_{121}	—	October 4, 2016	Mount Lemmon	Mount Lemmon Survey	·	2.0 km	MPC; JPL
869872	2016 TO_{122}	—	October 8, 2016	Haleakala	Pan-STARRS 1	EOS	1.3 km	MPC; JPL
869873	2016 TZ_{122}	—	October 6, 2016	Mount Lemmon	Mount Lemmon Survey	·	1.6 km	MPC; JPL
869874	2016 TA_{124}	—	October 6, 2016	Haleakala	Pan-STARRS 1	·	1.4 km	MPC; JPL
869875	2016 TS_{125}	—	October 1, 2016	Mount Lemmon	Mount Lemmon Survey	·	1.4 km	MPC; JPL
869876	2016 TW_{125}	—	October 12, 2016	Haleakala	Pan-STARRS 1	MRX	790 m	MPC; JPL
869877	2016 TD_{126}	—	October 2, 2016	Mount Lemmon	Mount Lemmon Survey	·	2.2 km	MPC; JPL
869878	2016 TE_{126}	—	October 9, 2016	Haleakala	Pan-STARRS 1	·	1.8 km	MPC; JPL
869879	2016 TG_{126}	—	October 10, 2016	Mount Lemmon	Mount Lemmon Survey	·	2.1 km	MPC; JPL
869880	2016 TK_{126}	—	October 1, 2016	Mount Lemmon	Mount Lemmon Survey	·	1.3 km	MPC; JPL
869881	2016 TO_{127}	—	August 16, 2016	Haleakala	Pan-STARRS 1	·	820 m	MPC; JPL
869882	2016 TR_{127}	—	October 5, 2016	Mount Lemmon	Mount Lemmon Survey	·	1.5 km	MPC; JPL
869883	2016 TB_{128}	—	October 4, 2016	Kitt Peak	Spacewatch	·	1.2 km	MPC; JPL
869884	2016 TL_{128}	—	October 7, 2016	Haleakala	Pan-STARRS 1	GEF	910 m	MPC; JPL
869885	2016 TM_{128}	—	October 7, 2016	Haleakala	Pan-STARRS 1	EUN	890 m	MPC; JPL
869886	2016 TE_{129}	—	October 10, 2016	Haleakala	Pan-STARRS 1	·	1.7 km	MPC; JPL
869887	2016 TN_{129}	—	October 4, 2016	Mount Lemmon	Mount Lemmon Survey	·	1.3 km	MPC; JPL
869888	2016 TK_{130}	—	October 2, 2016	Haleakala	Pan-STARRS 1	·	1.3 km	MPC; JPL
869889	2016 TN_{130}	—	October 6, 2016	Haleakala	Pan-STARRS 1	HOF	1.6 km	MPC; JPL
869890	2016 TO_{130}	—	October 2, 2016	Mount Lemmon	Mount Lemmon Survey	·	1.6 km	MPC; JPL
869891	2016 TP_{130}	—	October 7, 2016	Haleakala	Pan-STARRS 1	·	1.5 km	MPC; JPL
869892	2016 TZ_{130}	—	October 12, 2016	Haleakala	Pan-STARRS 1	·	1.4 km	MPC; JPL
869893	2016 TC_{131}	—	October 2, 2016	Mount Lemmon	Mount Lemmon Survey	·	1.5 km	MPC; JPL
869894	2016 TL_{131}	—	October 10, 2016	Mount Lemmon	Mount Lemmon Survey	·	1.4 km	MPC; JPL
869895	2016 TG_{133}	—	October 12, 2016	Haleakala	Pan-STARRS 1	·	800 m	MPC; JPL
869896	2016 TQ_{133}	—	October 7, 2016	Haleakala	Pan-STARRS 1	·	1.5 km	MPC; JPL
869897	2016 TX_{133}	—	September 23, 2011	Haleakala	Pan-STARRS 1	·	1.5 km	MPC; JPL
869898	2016 TP_{134}	—	October 12, 2016	Haleakala	Pan-STARRS 1	HOF	1.6 km	MPC; JPL
869899	2016 TD_{135}	—	October 7, 2016	Mount Lemmon	Mount Lemmon Survey	·	1.2 km	MPC; JPL
869900	2016 TO_{135}	—	October 7, 2016	Haleakala	Pan-STARRS 1	·	1.2 km	MPC; JPL

== 869901–870000 ==
back to top

Designation			Discovery			Properties		Ref
Permanent	Provisional	Named after	Date	Site	Discoverer(s)	Category	Diam.	Ref
869901	2016 TY_{135}	—	October 7, 2016	Haleakala	Pan-STARRS 1	·	1.5 km	MPC; JPL
869902	2016 TG_{136}	—	October 12, 2016	Mount Lemmon	Mount Lemmon Survey	·	1.9 km	MPC; JPL
869903	2016 TH_{136}	—	October 6, 2016	Haleakala	Pan-STARRS 1	·	1.2 km	MPC; JPL
869904	2016 TJ_{136}	—	October 2, 2016	Mount Lemmon	Mount Lemmon Survey	·	1.5 km	MPC; JPL
869905	2016 TH_{137}	—	October 12, 2016	Haleakala	Pan-STARRS 1	·	1.6 km	MPC; JPL
869906	2016 TQ_{137}	—	October 6, 2016	Haleakala	Pan-STARRS 1	H	360 m	MPC; JPL
869907	2016 TL_{138}	—	October 4, 2016	Mount Lemmon	Mount Lemmon Survey	·	1.4 km	MPC; JPL
869908	2016 TG_{139}	—	October 12, 2016	Haleakala	Pan-STARRS 1	·	1.2 km	MPC; JPL
869909	2016 TW_{139}	—	September 4, 1999	Kitt Peak	Spacewatch	EUN	760 m	MPC; JPL
869910	2016 TM_{140}	—	October 13, 2016	Haleakala	Pan-STARRS 1	·	740 m	MPC; JPL
869911	2016 TZ_{140}	—	September 12, 2007	Mount Lemmon	Mount Lemmon Survey	·	1.2 km	MPC; JPL
869912	2016 TD_{142}	—	October 7, 2016	Haleakala	Pan-STARRS 1	·	1.1 km	MPC; JPL
869913	2016 TQ_{142}	—	October 13, 2016	Haleakala	Pan-STARRS 1	·	1.6 km	MPC; JPL
869914	2016 TS_{142}	—	October 1, 2016	Mount Lemmon	Mount Lemmon Survey	·	1.9 km	MPC; JPL
869915	2016 TK_{143}	—	October 13, 2016	Haleakala	Pan-STARRS 1	·	1.3 km	MPC; JPL
869916	2016 TJ_{144}	—	October 12, 2016	Haleakala	Pan-STARRS 1	KOR	890 m	MPC; JPL
869917	2016 TY_{144}	—	October 6, 2016	Haleakala	Pan-STARRS 1	·	1.1 km	MPC; JPL
869918	2016 TC_{146}	—	October 7, 2016	Haleakala	Pan-STARRS 1	·	1.2 km	MPC; JPL
869919	2016 TB_{148}	—	October 5, 2016	Mount Lemmon	Mount Lemmon Survey	·	1.7 km	MPC; JPL
869920	2016 TR_{148}	—	October 10, 2016	Mount Lemmon	Mount Lemmon Survey	·	1.4 km	MPC; JPL
869921	2016 TQ_{149}	—	October 5, 2016	Mount Lemmon	Mount Lemmon Survey	EUN	760 m	MPC; JPL
869922	2016 TT_{150}	—	October 7, 2016	Haleakala	Pan-STARRS 1	·	1.2 km	MPC; JPL
869923	2016 TF_{151}	—	October 4, 2016	Mount Lemmon	Mount Lemmon Survey	·	1.6 km	MPC; JPL
869924	2016 TX_{153}	—	October 9, 2016	Mount Lemmon	Mount Lemmon Survey	3:2	4.1 km	MPC; JPL
869925	2016 TK_{155}	—	October 10, 2016	Mount Lemmon	Mount Lemmon Survey	EUN	900 m	MPC; JPL
869926	2016 TM_{159}	—	October 12, 2016	Haleakala	Pan-STARRS 1	BRA	1.0 km	MPC; JPL
869927	2016 TM_{163}	—	October 6, 2016	Mount Lemmon	Mount Lemmon Survey	PHO	740 m	MPC; JPL
869928	2016 TP_{164}	—	October 6, 2016	Haleakala	Pan-STARRS 1	·	1.2 km	MPC; JPL
869929	2016 TD_{165}	—	October 12, 2016	Haleakala	Pan-STARRS 1	·	450 m	MPC; JPL
869930	2016 TP_{166}	—	October 2, 2016	Mount Lemmon	Mount Lemmon Survey	·	1.2 km	MPC; JPL
869931	2016 TY_{166}	—	October 10, 2016	Mount Lemmon	Mount Lemmon Survey	·	1.5 km	MPC; JPL
869932	2016 TO_{168}	—	October 7, 2016	Kitt Peak	Spacewatch	·	1.4 km	MPC; JPL
869933	2016 TR_{168}	—	October 5, 2016	Mount Lemmon	Mount Lemmon Survey	·	2.4 km	MPC; JPL
869934	2016 TL_{169}	—	October 6, 2016	Haleakala	Pan-STARRS 1	EOS	1.4 km	MPC; JPL
869935	2016 TT_{174}	—	October 12, 2016	Mount Lemmon	Mount Lemmon Survey	·	1.9 km	MPC; JPL
869936	2016 TZ_{174}	—	October 7, 2016	Mount Lemmon	Mount Lemmon Survey	·	1.7 km	MPC; JPL
869937	2016 TR_{181}	—	October 8, 2016	Haleakala	Pan-STARRS 1	TEL	920 m	MPC; JPL
869938	2016 TH_{182}	—	October 7, 2016	Haleakala	Pan-STARRS 1	EOS	1.2 km	MPC; JPL
869939	2016 TN_{183}	—	October 6, 2016	Haleakala	Pan-STARRS 1	HOF	1.7 km	MPC; JPL
869940	2016 TO_{183}	—	October 8, 2016	Haleakala	Pan-STARRS 1	·	1.4 km	MPC; JPL
869941	2016 TN_{185}	—	October 4, 2016	Mount Lemmon	Mount Lemmon Survey	·	1.5 km	MPC; JPL
869942	2016 TC_{187}	—	October 7, 2016	Haleakala	Pan-STARRS 1	·	1.1 km	MPC; JPL
869943	2016 TA_{189}	—	October 10, 2016	Haleakala	Pan-STARRS 1	·	1.3 km	MPC; JPL
869944	2016 TB_{189}	—	October 9, 2016	Mount Lemmon	Mount Lemmon Survey	·	1.0 km	MPC; JPL
869945	2016 TK_{189}	—	October 9, 2016	Haleakala	Pan-STARRS 1	·	1.1 km	MPC; JPL
869946	2016 TF_{192}	—	February 17, 2013	Mount Lemmon	Mount Lemmon Survey	·	2.5 km	MPC; JPL
869947	2016 TA_{193}	—	November 2, 2007	Kitt Peak	Spacewatch	·	1.2 km	MPC; JPL
869948	2016 TH_{193}	—	October 12, 2016	Haleakala	Pan-STARRS 1	·	1.2 km	MPC; JPL
869949	2016 TT_{194}	—	October 20, 2007	Mount Lemmon	Mount Lemmon Survey	·	1.4 km	MPC; JPL
869950	2016 TW_{197}	—	October 9, 2016	Haleakala	Pan-STARRS 1	·	2.4 km	MPC; JPL
869951	2016 TV_{200}	—	October 8, 2016	Haleakala	Pan-STARRS 1	·	1.3 km	MPC; JPL
869952	2016 TJ_{207}	—	October 10, 2016	Haleakala	Pan-STARRS 1	·	2.0 km	MPC; JPL
869953	2016 TD_{214}	—	October 6, 2016	Haleakala	Pan-STARRS 1	·	1.3 km	MPC; JPL
869954	2016 UU_{1}	—	April 16, 2015	Haleakala	Pan-STARRS 1	·	1.6 km	MPC; JPL
869955	2016 UW_{2}	—	September 13, 2005	Kitt Peak	Spacewatch	·	1.4 km	MPC; JPL
869956	2016 UQ_{3}	—	October 1, 2005	Mount Lemmon	Mount Lemmon Survey	V	440 m	MPC; JPL
869957	2016 UT_{3}	—	August 26, 2012	Haleakala	Pan-STARRS 1	·	780 m	MPC; JPL
869958	2016 UU_{7}	—	September 18, 2003	Palomar	NEAT	·	1.4 km	MPC; JPL
869959	2016 UX_{7}	—	September 15, 2009	Mount Lemmon	Mount Lemmon Survey	V	440 m	MPC; JPL
869960	2016 UF_{8}	—	February 28, 2014	Haleakala	Pan-STARRS 1	·	1.8 km	MPC; JPL
869961	2016 UG_{8}	—	October 8, 2016	Mount Lemmon	Mount Lemmon Survey	H	390 m	MPC; JPL
869962	2016 UQ_{8}	—	July 11, 2016	Mount Lemmon	Mount Lemmon Survey	·	1.7 km	MPC; JPL
869963	2016 US_{10}	—	November 24, 2012	Kitt Peak	Spacewatch	MIS	1.6 km	MPC; JPL
869964	2016 UF_{11}	—	December 13, 2012	Mount Lemmon	Mount Lemmon Survey	·	1.3 km	MPC; JPL
869965	2016 UZ_{11}	—	October 6, 2016	Haleakala	Pan-STARRS 1	·	1.3 km	MPC; JPL
869966	2016 UM_{15}	—	October 22, 2005	Kitt Peak	Spacewatch	TIR · fast	1.6 km	MPC; JPL
869967	2016 UY_{15}	—	October 2, 2016	Mount Lemmon	Mount Lemmon Survey	·	570 m	MPC; JPL
869968	2016 US_{16}	—	March 25, 2015	Mount Lemmon	Mount Lemmon Survey	·	1.0 km	MPC; JPL
869969	2016 UA_{17}	—	November 3, 2007	Mount Lemmon	Mount Lemmon Survey	·	1.7 km	MPC; JPL
869970	2016 US_{17}	—	October 25, 2003	Kitt Peak	Spacewatch	·	1.2 km	MPC; JPL
869971	2016 UV_{17}	—	October 11, 2007	Mount Lemmon	Mount Lemmon Survey	·	1.5 km	MPC; JPL
869972	2016 UC_{18}	—	October 8, 2016	Mount Lemmon	Mount Lemmon Survey	·	910 m	MPC; JPL
869973	2016 UJ_{19}	—	August 15, 2016	Haleakala	Pan-STARRS 1	·	470 m	MPC; JPL
869974	2016 UM_{19}	—	August 17, 2016	Haleakala	Pan-STARRS 1	·	1.4 km	MPC; JPL
869975	2016 UF_{22}	—	November 3, 2011	Catalina	CSS	·	1.8 km	MPC; JPL
869976	2016 UR_{23}	—	December 29, 2005	Mount Lemmon	Mount Lemmon Survey	MAS	620 m	MPC; JPL
869977	2016 UT_{23}	—	September 17, 2012	Mount Lemmon	Mount Lemmon Survey	MAS	620 m	MPC; JPL
869978	2016 UP_{24}	—	September 27, 2016	Haleakala	Pan-STARRS 1	·	770 m	MPC; JPL
869979	2016 UD_{28}	—	July 22, 2016	Haleakala	Pan-STARRS 1	·	2.9 km	MPC; JPL
869980	2016 UC_{29}	—	September 20, 2011	Haleakala	Pan-STARRS 1	·	1.5 km	MPC; JPL
869981	2016 UB_{30}	—	January 18, 2012	Mount Lemmon	Mount Lemmon Survey	·	2.0 km	MPC; JPL
869982	2016 UG_{30}	—	November 13, 2012	Mount Lemmon	Mount Lemmon Survey	·	1.2 km	MPC; JPL
869983	2016 UL_{30}	—	November 7, 2012	Mount Lemmon	Mount Lemmon Survey	·	1.1 km	MPC; JPL
869984	2016 UJ_{31}	—	October 22, 2016	Mount Lemmon	Mount Lemmon Survey	APO · PHA	460 m	MPC; JPL
869985	2016 UY_{31}	—	March 16, 2013	Mount Lemmon	Mount Lemmon Survey	·	2.7 km	MPC; JPL
869986	2016 UB_{33}	—	October 22, 2005	Kitt Peak	Spacewatch	·	780 m	MPC; JPL
869987	2016 UR_{33}	—	August 29, 2016	Mount Lemmon	Mount Lemmon Survey	DOR	1.9 km	MPC; JPL
869988	2016 UE_{36}	—	October 19, 2003	Kitt Peak	Spacewatch	H	400 m	MPC; JPL
869989	2016 UJ_{37}	—	September 28, 2003	Kitt Peak	Spacewatch	·	1.1 km	MPC; JPL
869990	2016 UN_{37}	—	December 5, 2005	Kitt Peak	Spacewatch	·	2.0 km	MPC; JPL
869991	2016 UC_{38}	—	August 10, 2016	Haleakala	Pan-STARRS 1	·	1.9 km	MPC; JPL
869992	2016 UL_{39}	—	January 20, 2009	Kitt Peak	Spacewatch	·	910 m	MPC; JPL
869993	2016 UE_{41}	—	March 31, 2015	Haleakala	Pan-STARRS 1	H	290 m	MPC; JPL
869994	2016 UT_{42}	—	April 13, 2015	Haleakala	Pan-STARRS 1	H	470 m	MPC; JPL
869995	2016 UN_{43}	—	November 5, 1999	Kitt Peak	Spacewatch	(5)	870 m	MPC; JPL
869996	2016 UC_{45}	—	October 25, 2016	Haleakala	Pan-STARRS 1	EOS	1.2 km	MPC; JPL
869997	2016 UC_{46}	—	September 6, 2010	Mount Lemmon	Mount Lemmon Survey	·	2.5 km	MPC; JPL
869998	2016 UP_{48}	—	October 11, 2007	Mount Lemmon	Mount Lemmon Survey	·	1.2 km	MPC; JPL
869999	2016 UM_{49}	—	September 21, 2011	Mount Lemmon	Mount Lemmon Survey	·	1.3 km	MPC; JPL
870000	2016 UO_{50}	—	September 17, 2012	Mount Lemmon	Mount Lemmon Survey	MAS	450 m	MPC; JPL

back to top

== See also ==
- Meanings of minor-planet names: 869001–870000
