= List of minor planets: 772001–773000 =

The following is a partial list of minor planets, running from minor-planet number 772001 through 773000, inclusive. The primary data for this and other partial lists is based on JPL's "Small-Body Orbital Elements" and data available from the Minor Planet Center. Critical list information is also provided by the MPC, unless otherwise specified from Lowell Observatory. A detailed description of the table's columns and additional sources are given on the main page including a complete list of every page in this series, and a statistical break-up on the dynamical classification of minor planets.

Also see the summary list of all named bodies in numerical and alphabetical order, and the corresponding naming citations for the number range of this particular list. New namings may only be added to this list after official publication, as the preannouncement of names is condemned by the Working Group for Small Bodies Nomenclature of the International Astronomical Union.

Near-Earth obj.	MBA (inner)	MBA (outer)	Centaur
Mars-crosser	MBA (middle)	Jupiter trojan	Trans-Neptunian obj.
Unclassified

== 772001–772100 ==
Designation			Discovery			Properties		Ref
Permanent	Provisional	Named after	Date	Site	Discoverer(s)	Category	Diam.	Ref
772001	2017 BR_{113}	—	January 30, 2017	Mount Lemmon	Mount Lemmon Survey	·	2.0 km	MPC · JPL
772002	2017 BU_{113}	—	May 4, 2005	Mount Lemmon	Mount Lemmon Survey	ADE	1.5 km	MPC · JPL
772003	2017 BZ_{115}	—	May 8, 2014	Haleakala	Pan-STARRS 1	·	1.1 km	MPC · JPL
772004	2017 BE_{123}	—	October 13, 2006	Kitt Peak	Spacewatch	WIT	740 m	MPC · JPL
772005	2017 BK_{128}	—	January 20, 2013	Kitt Peak	Spacewatch	·	1.5 km	MPC · JPL
772006	2017 BE_{133}	—	July 3, 2014	Haleakala	Pan-STARRS 1	·	1.5 km	MPC · JPL
772007	2017 BM_{133}	—	February 20, 2006	Kitt Peak	Spacewatch	·	2.3 km	MPC · JPL
772008	2017 BT_{134}	—	January 31, 2009	Mount Lemmon	Mount Lemmon Survey	·	860 m	MPC · JPL
772009	2017 BA_{137}	—	December 18, 2007	Mount Lemmon	Mount Lemmon Survey	·	1.2 km	MPC · JPL
772010	2017 BO_{137}	—	November 2, 2007	Mount Lemmon	Mount Lemmon Survey	·	810 m	MPC · JPL
772011	2017 BT_{137}	—	November 3, 2015	Mount Lemmon	Mount Lemmon Survey	·	1.2 km	MPC · JPL
772012	2017 BK_{138}	—	March 13, 2012	Kitt Peak	Spacewatch	·	2.1 km	MPC · JPL
772013	2017 BN_{139}	—	November 22, 2015	Mount Lemmon	Mount Lemmon Survey	HYG	2.4 km	MPC · JPL
772014	2017 BS_{139}	—	October 3, 2015	Mount Lemmon	Mount Lemmon Survey	·	920 m	MPC · JPL
772015	2017 BQ_{140}	—	October 26, 2011	Mayhill-ISON	L. Elenin	·	1.3 km	MPC · JPL
772016	2017 BJ_{141}	—	September 2, 2014	Haleakala	Pan-STARRS 1	EOS	1.5 km	MPC · JPL
772017	2017 BK_{142}	—	January 27, 2017	Haleakala	Pan-STARRS 1	HNS	820 m	MPC · JPL
772018	2017 BO_{142}	—	January 28, 2017	Haleakala	Pan-STARRS 1	H	430 m	MPC · JPL
772019	2017 BR_{143}	—	January 26, 2017	Haleakala	Pan-STARRS 1	HNS	730 m	MPC · JPL
772020	2017 BW_{146}	—	January 26, 2017	Mount Lemmon	Mount Lemmon Survey	H	410 m	MPC · JPL
772021	2017 BF_{149}	—	January 30, 2017	Haleakala	Pan-STARRS 1	·	2.0 km	MPC · JPL
772022	2017 BK_{153}	—	January 31, 2017	Haleakala	Pan-STARRS 1	·	1.3 km	MPC · JPL
772023	2017 BA_{156}	—	January 30, 2017	Haleakala	Pan-STARRS 1	·	850 m	MPC · JPL
772024	2017 BR_{156}	—	January 28, 2017	Haleakala	Pan-STARRS 1	L5	7.3 km	MPC · JPL
772025	2017 BU_{156}	—	January 30, 2017	Haleakala	Pan-STARRS 1	·	2.0 km	MPC · JPL
772026	2017 BW_{156}	—	January 28, 2017	Haleakala	Pan-STARRS 1	·	1.4 km	MPC · JPL
772027	2017 BH_{158}	—	January 16, 2017	Haleakala	Pan-STARRS 1	H	420 m	MPC · JPL
772028	2017 BX_{159}	—	September 25, 2014	Mount Lemmon	Mount Lemmon Survey	GAL	1.2 km	MPC · JPL
772029	2017 BC_{161}	—	January 30, 2017	Haleakala	Pan-STARRS 1	L5	7.2 km	MPC · JPL
772030	2017 BX_{161}	—	January 28, 2017	Haleakala	Pan-STARRS 1	JUN	830 m	MPC · JPL
772031	2017 BX_{163}	—	January 28, 2017	Haleakala	Pan-STARRS 1	·	1.2 km	MPC · JPL
772032	2017 BW_{164}	—	January 28, 2017	Haleakala	Pan-STARRS 1	L5	6.6 km	MPC · JPL
772033	2017 BM_{165}	—	January 26, 2017	Haleakala	Pan-STARRS 1	DOR	1.9 km	MPC · JPL
772034	2017 BS_{167}	—	January 28, 2017	Haleakala	Pan-STARRS 1	L5	6.3 km	MPC · JPL
772035	2017 BD_{171}	—	January 27, 2017	Haleakala	Pan-STARRS 1	L5	6.2 km	MPC · JPL
772036	2017 BZ_{171}	—	January 27, 2017	Haleakala	Pan-STARRS 1	·	1.6 km	MPC · JPL
772037	2017 BX_{177}	—	January 29, 2017	Haleakala	Pan-STARRS 1	·	1.7 km	MPC · JPL
772038	2017 BD_{178}	—	January 27, 2017	Haleakala	Pan-STARRS 1	·	900 m	MPC · JPL
772039	2017 BJ_{178}	—	January 20, 2017	Haleakala	Pan-STARRS 1	L5	6.3 km	MPC · JPL
772040	2017 BV_{180}	—	January 28, 2017	Haleakala	Pan-STARRS 1	·	910 m	MPC · JPL
772041	2017 BP_{181}	—	January 30, 2017	Haleakala	Pan-STARRS 1	·	1 km	MPC · JPL
772042	2017 BA_{186}	—	January 31, 2017	Haleakala	Pan-STARRS 1	·	970 m	MPC · JPL
772043	2017 BJ_{219}	—	January 28, 2017	Haleakala	Pan-STARRS 1	L5	7.0 km	MPC · JPL
772044	2017 CC_{2}	—	March 5, 2013	Haleakala	Pan-STARRS 1	·	1.8 km	MPC · JPL
772045	2017 CT_{5}	—	November 3, 2011	Mount Lemmon	Mount Lemmon Survey	·	1.3 km	MPC · JPL
772046	2017 CF_{6}	—	February 1, 2017	Mount Lemmon	Mount Lemmon Survey	·	1.3 km	MPC · JPL
772047	2017 CP_{7}	—	February 14, 2009	Mount Lemmon	Mount Lemmon Survey	H	430 m	MPC · JPL
772048	2017 CW_{7}	—	January 9, 2006	Kitt Peak	Spacewatch	EOS	1.5 km	MPC · JPL
772049	2017 CL_{9}	—	September 12, 2010	Mount Lemmon	Mount Lemmon Survey	·	1.0 km	MPC · JPL
772050	2017 CY_{15}	—	February 3, 2017	Mount Lemmon	Mount Lemmon Survey	·	820 m	MPC · JPL
772051	2017 CW_{16}	—	January 30, 2004	Kitt Peak	Spacewatch	·	1.1 km	MPC · JPL
772052	2017 CE_{17}	—	March 4, 2013	Haleakala	Pan-STARRS 1	EUN	1.0 km	MPC · JPL
772053	2017 CX_{17}	—	December 15, 2007	Mount Lemmon	Mount Lemmon Survey	MIS	1.9 km	MPC · JPL
772054	2017 CO_{19}	—	October 31, 2005	Mauna Kea	A. Boattini	L5	6.2 km	MPC · JPL
772055	2017 CD_{24}	—	November 10, 2010	Mount Lemmon	Mount Lemmon Survey	KOR	1.1 km	MPC · JPL
772056	2017 CU_{25}	—	November 1, 2008	Mount Lemmon	Mount Lemmon Survey	NYS	800 m	MPC · JPL
772057	2017 CU_{26}	—	February 1, 2017	Mount Lemmon	Mount Lemmon Survey	·	960 m	MPC · JPL
772058	2017 CK_{28}	—	March 15, 2004	Kitt Peak	Spacewatch	·	1.4 km	MPC · JPL
772059	2017 CK_{30}	—	September 30, 2005	Mount Lemmon	Mount Lemmon Survey	·	1.3 km	MPC · JPL
772060	2017 CK_{34}	—	December 29, 2011	Mount Lemmon	Mount Lemmon Survey	·	1.6 km	MPC · JPL
772061	2017 CT_{34}	—	December 2, 2015	Haleakala	Pan-STARRS 1	HNS	860 m	MPC · JPL
772062	2017 CX_{34}	—	January 19, 2012	Haleakala	Pan-STARRS 1	·	2.0 km	MPC · JPL
772063	2017 CJ_{35}	—	October 21, 2011	Mount Lemmon	Mount Lemmon Survey	JUN	880 m	MPC · JPL
772064	2017 CT_{37}	—	February 4, 2017	Haleakala	Pan-STARRS 1	EOS	1.3 km	MPC · JPL
772065	2017 CF_{39}	—	February 3, 2017	Mount Lemmon	Mount Lemmon Survey	·	1.5 km	MPC · JPL
772066	2017 CM_{40}	—	February 1, 2017	Kitt Peak	Spacewatch	L5	6.8 km	MPC · JPL
772067	2017 CN_{43}	—	February 4, 2017	Haleakala	Pan-STARRS 1	·	970 m	MPC · JPL
772068	2017 CQ_{44}	—	February 2, 2017	Haleakala	Pan-STARRS 1	·	1.8 km	MPC · JPL
772069	2017 CR_{44}	—	February 3, 2017	Haleakala	Pan-STARRS 1	L5	7.2 km	MPC · JPL
772070	2017 CV_{46}	—	February 4, 2017	Haleakala	Pan-STARRS 1	·	1.9 km	MPC · JPL
772071	2017 CQ_{47}	—	February 3, 2017	Haleakala	Pan-STARRS 1	GEF	1.1 km	MPC · JPL
772072	2017 CX_{49}	—	February 2, 2017	Haleakala	Pan-STARRS 1	L5	6.8 km	MPC · JPL
772073	2017 DZ	—	December 4, 2007	Mount Lemmon	Mount Lemmon Survey	·	1.2 km	MPC · JPL
772074	2017 DQ_{3}	—	January 27, 2017	Haleakala	Pan-STARRS 1	·	2.0 km	MPC · JPL
772075	2017 DF_{8}	—	February 17, 2017	Haleakala	Pan-STARRS 1	·	2.5 km	MPC · JPL
772076	2017 DP_{8}	—	March 6, 2008	Mount Lemmon	Mount Lemmon Survey	·	1.8 km	MPC · JPL
772077	2017 DR_{10}	—	December 25, 2005	Mount Lemmon	Mount Lemmon Survey	·	1.7 km	MPC · JPL
772078	2017 DM_{11}	—	March 31, 2013	Mount Lemmon	Mount Lemmon Survey	·	1.4 km	MPC · JPL
772079	2017 DA_{14}	—	January 16, 2008	Mount Lemmon	Mount Lemmon Survey	·	1.1 km	MPC · JPL
772080	2017 DL_{17}	—	July 28, 2014	Haleakala	Pan-STARRS 1	·	1.1 km	MPC · JPL
772081	2017 DY_{19}	—	July 25, 2015	Haleakala	Pan-STARRS 1	·	1.1 km	MPC · JPL
772082	2017 DT_{20}	—	March 12, 2010	Mount Lemmon	Mount Lemmon Survey	·	600 m	MPC · JPL
772083	2017 DJ_{24}	—	September 12, 2010	Mount Lemmon	Mount Lemmon Survey	·	1.3 km	MPC · JPL
772084	2017 DO_{26}	—	January 17, 2008	Mount Lemmon	Mount Lemmon Survey	HNS	1.0 km	MPC · JPL
772085	2017 DV_{27}	—	October 19, 2011	Mount Lemmon	Mount Lemmon Survey	·	1.2 km	MPC · JPL
772086	2017 DX_{32}	—	January 9, 2017	Mount Lemmon	Mount Lemmon Survey	·	1.4 km	MPC · JPL
772087	2017 DA_{33}	—	June 24, 2015	Haleakala	Pan-STARRS 1	H	420 m	MPC · JPL
772088	2017 DE_{33}	—	March 12, 2013	Kitt Peak	Spacewatch	·	1.0 km	MPC · JPL
772089	2017 DD_{41}	—	February 2, 2008	Mount Lemmon	Mount Lemmon Survey	·	1.2 km	MPC · JPL
772090	2017 DT_{42}	—	October 2, 2006	Mount Lemmon	Mount Lemmon Survey	·	1.4 km	MPC · JPL
772091	2017 DZ_{43}	—	November 26, 2014	Haleakala	Pan-STARRS 1	L5	7.1 km	MPC · JPL
772092	2017 DQ_{44}	—	September 16, 2006	Kitt Peak	Spacewatch	·	1.1 km	MPC · JPL
772093	2017 DT_{46}	—	April 10, 2013	Haleakala	Pan-STARRS 1	HOF	2.0 km	MPC · JPL
772094	2017 DJ_{54}	—	February 14, 2013	Haleakala	Pan-STARRS 1	·	750 m	MPC · JPL
772095	2017 DH_{55}	—	December 6, 2015	Mount Lemmon	Mount Lemmon Survey	·	2.0 km	MPC · JPL
772096	2017 DO_{55}	—	December 3, 2015	Mount Lemmon	Mount Lemmon Survey	·	2.2 km	MPC · JPL
772097	2017 DZ_{56}	—	October 10, 2015	Haleakala	Pan-STARRS 1	·	1.3 km	MPC · JPL
772098	2017 DC_{60}	—	February 3, 2008	Mount Lemmon	Mount Lemmon Survey	·	1.2 km	MPC · JPL
772099	2017 DP_{60}	—	August 19, 2014	Haleakala	Pan-STARRS 1	·	2.0 km	MPC · JPL
772100	2017 DH_{63}	—	December 13, 2010	Mount Lemmon	Mount Lemmon Survey	THM	1.8 km	MPC · JPL

== 772101–772200 ==
back to top

Designation			Discovery			Properties		Ref
Permanent	Provisional	Named after	Date	Site	Discoverer(s)	Category	Diam.	Ref
772101	2017 DT_{63}	—	January 19, 2013	Mount Lemmon	Mount Lemmon Survey	·	920 m	MPC · JPL
772102	2017 DL_{65}	—	April 27, 2012	Haleakala	Pan-STARRS 1	ELF	2.9 km	MPC · JPL
772103	2017 DU_{68}	—	January 31, 2017	Mount Lemmon	Mount Lemmon Survey	DOR	2.0 km	MPC · JPL
772104	2017 DF_{73}	—	August 30, 2014	Mount Lemmon	Mount Lemmon Survey	ADE	1.4 km	MPC · JPL
772105	2017 DG_{74}	—	August 27, 2009	Kitt Peak	Spacewatch	·	1.3 km	MPC · JPL
772106	2017 DU_{80}	—	January 18, 2008	Mount Lemmon	Mount Lemmon Survey	JUN · fast	800 m	MPC · JPL
772107	2017 DM_{85}	—	January 21, 2004	Socorro	LINEAR	·	1.1 km	MPC · JPL
772108	2017 DN_{88}	—	August 15, 2004	Cerro Tololo	Deep Ecliptic Survey	·	1.7 km	MPC · JPL
772109	2017 DW_{88}	—	July 27, 2014	Haleakala	Pan-STARRS 1	·	1.3 km	MPC · JPL
772110	2017 DN_{90}	—	December 13, 2006	Mount Lemmon	Mount Lemmon Survey	·	1.5 km	MPC · JPL
772111	2017 DL_{91}	—	July 2, 2014	Haleakala	Pan-STARRS 1	HNS	720 m	MPC · JPL
772112	2017 DX_{91}	—	December 13, 2015	Haleakala	Pan-STARRS 1	·	2.2 km	MPC · JPL
772113	2017 DH_{92}	—	January 26, 2017	Haleakala	Pan-STARRS 1	·	1.5 km	MPC · JPL
772114	2017 DN_{92}	—	February 3, 2017	Haleakala	Pan-STARRS 1	·	1.1 km	MPC · JPL
772115	2017 DC_{94}	—	April 13, 2013	Haleakala	Pan-STARRS 1	·	1.4 km	MPC · JPL
772116	2017 DY_{94}	—	April 27, 2012	Haleakala	Pan-STARRS 1	·	1.9 km	MPC · JPL
772117	2017 DY_{95}	—	November 19, 2015	Mount Lemmon	Mount Lemmon Survey	·	1.2 km	MPC · JPL
772118	2017 DN_{97}	—	February 1, 2006	Mount Lemmon	Mount Lemmon Survey	HYG	1.9 km	MPC · JPL
772119	2017 DQ_{98}	—	September 20, 2008	Mount Lemmon	Mount Lemmon Survey	VER	2.2 km	MPC · JPL
772120	2017 DF_{99}	—	February 22, 2017	Haleakala	Pan-STARRS 1	·	620 m	MPC · JPL
772121	2017 DY_{99}	—	February 10, 2011	Mount Lemmon	Mount Lemmon Survey	·	2.4 km	MPC · JPL
772122	2017 DU_{100}	—	March 13, 2013	Haleakala	Pan-STARRS 1	EUN	770 m	MPC · JPL
772123	2017 DU_{103}	—	March 12, 2008	Mount Lemmon	Mount Lemmon Survey	·	1.3 km	MPC · JPL
772124	2017 DG_{105}	—	November 2, 2015	Haleakala	Pan-STARRS 1	·	2.3 km	MPC · JPL
772125	2017 DJ_{106}	—	September 25, 2009	Kitt Peak	Spacewatch	·	2.1 km	MPC · JPL
772126	2017 DR_{106}	—	December 10, 2010	Mount Lemmon	Mount Lemmon Survey	·	2.4 km	MPC · JPL
772127	2017 DU_{106}	—	February 24, 2017	Mount Lemmon	Mount Lemmon Survey	·	1.0 km	MPC · JPL
772128	2017 DF_{107}	—	January 26, 2017	Haleakala	Pan-STARRS 1	·	1.1 km	MPC · JPL
772129	2017 DQ_{108}	—	March 19, 2013	Haleakala	Pan-STARRS 1	·	1.1 km	MPC · JPL
772130	2017 DO_{113}	—	October 26, 2011	Haleakala	Pan-STARRS 1	·	1.3 km	MPC · JPL
772131	2017 DJ_{116}	—	April 24, 2012	Mount Lemmon	Mount Lemmon Survey	H	440 m	MPC · JPL
772132	2017 DC_{121}	—	June 21, 2014	Mount Lemmon	Mount Lemmon Survey	·	980 m	MPC · JPL
772133	2017 DM_{122}	—	April 19, 2012	Mount Lemmon	Mount Lemmon Survey	·	2.6 km	MPC · JPL
772134	2017 DO_{122}	—	April 11, 2013	Mount Lemmon	Mount Lemmon Survey	·	1.4 km	MPC · JPL
772135	2017 DS_{122}	—	October 10, 2015	Haleakala	Pan-STARRS 1	EUN	780 m	MPC · JPL
772136	2017 DD_{126}	—	February 17, 2017	Haleakala	Pan-STARRS 1	EUN	920 m	MPC · JPL
772137	2017 DF_{132}	—	February 22, 2017	Mount Lemmon	Mount Lemmon Survey	·	1.4 km	MPC · JPL
772138	2017 DP_{140}	—	January 13, 2008	Kitt Peak	Spacewatch	·	1.4 km	MPC · JPL
772139	2017 DO_{148}	—	September 10, 2015	Haleakala	Pan-STARRS 1	·	1.1 km	MPC · JPL
772140	2017 ER_{3}	—	February 16, 2017	Mount Lemmon	Mount Lemmon Survey	H	560 m	MPC · JPL
772141	2017 EY_{4}	—	January 11, 2008	Mount Lemmon	Mount Lemmon Survey	·	1.3 km	MPC · JPL
772142	2017 EZ_{7}	—	February 8, 2000	Apache Point	SDSS	·	1.2 km	MPC · JPL
772143	2017 EZ_{9}	—	February 22, 2017	Mount Lemmon	Mount Lemmon Survey	H	430 m	MPC · JPL
772144	2017 EA_{11}	—	March 16, 2012	Haleakala	Pan-STARRS 1	·	2.7 km	MPC · JPL
772145	2017 EC_{12}	—	January 18, 2008	Mount Lemmon	Mount Lemmon Survey	·	1.1 km	MPC · JPL
772146	2017 ER_{12}	—	January 30, 2017	Haleakala	Pan-STARRS 1	EOS	1.5 km	MPC · JPL
772147	2017 EA_{13}	—	August 28, 2014	Haleakala	Pan-STARRS 1	·	1.3 km	MPC · JPL
772148	2017 ET_{13}	—	January 26, 2017	Haleakala	Pan-STARRS 1	·	1.2 km	MPC · JPL
772149	2017 ER_{18}	—	June 1, 2013	Haleakala	Pan-STARRS 1	·	1.7 km	MPC · JPL
772150	2017 ET_{18}	—	January 3, 2016	Haleakala	Pan-STARRS 1	HNS	900 m	MPC · JPL
772151	2017 EU_{18}	—	October 25, 2003	Kitt Peak	Spacewatch	·	1.1 km	MPC · JPL
772152	2017 EL_{19}	—	December 9, 2015	Mount Lemmon	Mount Lemmon Survey	·	2.5 km	MPC · JPL
772153	2017 ES_{20}	—	January 13, 2004	Kitt Peak	Spacewatch	·	1.0 km	MPC · JPL
772154	2017 EM_{24}	—	April 19, 2012	Mount Lemmon	Mount Lemmon Survey	·	1.7 km	MPC · JPL
772155	2017 ED_{25}	—	October 1, 2014	Haleakala	Pan-STARRS 1	·	1.5 km	MPC · JPL
772156	2017 EG_{29}	—	March 7, 2017	Haleakala	Pan-STARRS 1	HNS	770 m	MPC · JPL
772157	2017 EK_{29}	—	March 4, 2017	Haleakala	Pan-STARRS 1	·	890 m	MPC · JPL
772158	2017 ES_{30}	—	March 4, 2017	Haleakala	Pan-STARRS 1	·	1.4 km	MPC · JPL
772159	2017 ED_{31}	—	March 7, 2017	Haleakala	Pan-STARRS 1	·	1.4 km	MPC · JPL
772160	2017 ES_{31}	—	April 9, 2013	Haleakala	Pan-STARRS 1	KON	1.3 km	MPC · JPL
772161	2017 ET_{31}	—	March 7, 2017	Haleakala	Pan-STARRS 1	·	1.3 km	MPC · JPL
772162	2017 EZ_{31}	—	March 5, 2017	Haleakala	Pan-STARRS 1	·	1.1 km	MPC · JPL
772163	2017 EU_{32}	—	March 7, 2017	Haleakala	Pan-STARRS 1	·	1.5 km	MPC · JPL
772164	2017 EA_{33}	—	March 7, 2017	Haleakala	Pan-STARRS 1	·	1.6 km	MPC · JPL
772165	2017 EX_{33}	—	March 5, 2017	Haleakala	Pan-STARRS 1	·	1 km	MPC · JPL
772166	2017 ED_{34}	—	March 7, 2017	Haleakala	Pan-STARRS 1	HOF	1.9 km	MPC · JPL
772167	2017 EE_{37}	—	March 5, 2017	Haleakala	Pan-STARRS 1	·	1.1 km	MPC · JPL
772168	2017 EJ_{37}	—	March 5, 2017	Haleakala	Pan-STARRS 1	·	1.1 km	MPC · JPL
772169	2017 EP_{37}	—	March 2, 2017	Mount Lemmon	Mount Lemmon Survey	·	1.1 km	MPC · JPL
772170	2017 EK_{39}	—	March 2, 2017	Mount Lemmon	Mount Lemmon Survey	CLO	1.8 km	MPC · JPL
772171	2017 EE_{40}	—	June 1, 2013	Mount Lemmon	Mount Lemmon Survey	·	1.7 km	MPC · JPL
772172	2017 EP_{45}	—	March 7, 2017	Haleakala	Pan-STARRS 1	·	2.2 km	MPC · JPL
772173	2017 ET_{45}	—	March 4, 2017	Haleakala	Pan-STARRS 1	AGN	950 m	MPC · JPL
772174	2017 EA_{48}	—	March 7, 2017	Haleakala	Pan-STARRS 1	·	2.5 km	MPC · JPL
772175	2017 EG_{48}	—	March 4, 2017	Haleakala	Pan-STARRS 1	·	2.3 km	MPC · JPL
772176	2017 FN_{3}	—	August 28, 2014	Haleakala	Pan-STARRS 1	·	2.0 km	MPC · JPL
772177	2017 FR_{3}	—	January 30, 2011	Mount Lemmon	Mount Lemmon Survey	THM	1.8 km	MPC · JPL
772178	2017 FD_{6}	—	January 31, 2017	Mount Lemmon	Mount Lemmon Survey	·	1.1 km	MPC · JPL
772179	2017 FH_{7}	—	November 12, 2007	Mount Lemmon	Mount Lemmon Survey	(5)	1.0 km	MPC · JPL
772180	2017 FG_{9}	—	October 28, 2011	Mount Lemmon	Mount Lemmon Survey	·	1.2 km	MPC · JPL
772181	2017 FN_{12}	—	October 8, 2015	Haleakala	Pan-STARRS 1	·	1.4 km	MPC · JPL
772182	2017 FX_{12}	—	October 12, 2015	Catalina	CSS	·	970 m	MPC · JPL
772183	2017 FE_{13}	—	May 12, 2012	Kitt Peak	Spacewatch	H	490 m	MPC · JPL
772184	2017 FD_{16}	—	November 18, 2007	Mount Lemmon	Mount Lemmon Survey	·	920 m	MPC · JPL
772185	2017 FA_{20}	—	August 20, 2014	Haleakala	Pan-STARRS 1	AGN	880 m	MPC · JPL
772186	2017 FT_{22}	—	January 20, 2008	Kitt Peak	Spacewatch	·	1.1 km	MPC · JPL
772187	2017 FY_{22}	—	September 15, 2010	Kitt Peak	Spacewatch	·	1.4 km	MPC · JPL
772188	2017 FY_{23}	—	March 8, 2017	Mount Lemmon	Mount Lemmon Survey	·	1.2 km	MPC · JPL
772189	2017 FZ_{23}	—	December 19, 2007	Mount Lemmon	Mount Lemmon Survey	·	1.2 km	MPC · JPL
772190	2017 FO_{24}	—	August 22, 2014	Haleakala	Pan-STARRS 1	AGN	950 m	MPC · JPL
772191	2017 FD_{26}	—	August 9, 2013	Haleakala	Pan-STARRS 1	·	2.4 km	MPC · JPL
772192	2017 FW_{27}	—	November 5, 2007	Kitt Peak	Spacewatch	(5)	860 m	MPC · JPL
772193	2017 FQ_{28}	—	February 21, 2017	Haleakala	Pan-STARRS 1	·	1.3 km	MPC · JPL
772194	2017 FU_{28}	—	December 14, 2015	Haleakala	Pan-STARRS 1	·	1.4 km	MPC · JPL
772195	2017 FO_{29}	—	March 5, 2008	Mount Lemmon	Mount Lemmon Survey	·	1.1 km	MPC · JPL
772196	2017 FG_{32}	—	January 9, 2016	Haleakala	Pan-STARRS 1	·	1.9 km	MPC · JPL
772197	2017 FO_{32}	—	March 16, 2009	Mount Lemmon	Mount Lemmon Survey	3:2	4.9 km	MPC · JPL
772198	2017 FH_{35}	—	February 23, 2011	Catalina	CSS	·	2.4 km	MPC · JPL
772199	2017 FA_{36}	—	September 11, 2010	Mount Lemmon	Mount Lemmon Survey	·	1.2 km	MPC · JPL
772200	2017 FF_{37}	—	January 26, 2017	Haleakala	Pan-STARRS 1	GAL	1.4 km	MPC · JPL

== 772201–772300 ==
back to top

Designation			Discovery			Properties		Ref
Permanent	Provisional	Named after	Date	Site	Discoverer(s)	Category	Diam.	Ref
772201	2017 FW_{38}	—	November 18, 2011	Mount Lemmon	Mount Lemmon Survey	·	1.1 km	MPC · JPL
772202	2017 FM_{39}	—	March 13, 2013	Mount Lemmon	Mount Lemmon Survey	·	1.3 km	MPC · JPL
772203	2017 FD_{41}	—	February 29, 2008	Kitt Peak	Spacewatch	AEO	910 m	MPC · JPL
772204	2017 FX_{43}	—	April 10, 2013	Haleakala	Pan-STARRS 1	·	1.1 km	MPC · JPL
772205	2017 FD_{44}	—	January 29, 2012	Kitt Peak	Spacewatch	·	1.4 km	MPC · JPL
772206	2017 FE_{45}	—	January 27, 2011	Mount Lemmon	Mount Lemmon Survey	·	2.2 km	MPC · JPL
772207	2017 FG_{47}	—	September 20, 2014	Haleakala	Pan-STARRS 1	ADE	1.7 km	MPC · JPL
772208	2017 FK_{48}	—	July 7, 2014	Haleakala	Pan-STARRS 1	·	770 m	MPC · JPL
772209	2017 FJ_{51}	—	January 30, 2011	Piszkés-tető	K. Sárneczky, Z. Kuli	·	2.2 km	MPC · JPL
772210	2017 FF_{54}	—	January 14, 2011	Mount Lemmon	Mount Lemmon Survey	·	1.7 km	MPC · JPL
772211	2017 FN_{54}	—	January 11, 2008	Kitt Peak	Spacewatch	EUN	970 m	MPC · JPL
772212	2017 FX_{55}	—	June 3, 2014	Haleakala	Pan-STARRS 1	PHO	690 m	MPC · JPL
772213	2017 FC_{57}	—	April 17, 2013	Haleakala	Pan-STARRS 1	·	1.2 km	MPC · JPL
772214	2017 FM_{57}	—	September 9, 2015	Haleakala	Pan-STARRS 1	·	2.5 km	MPC · JPL
772215	2017 FX_{57}	—	January 27, 2017	Haleakala	Pan-STARRS 1	·	1.2 km	MPC · JPL
772216	2017 FR_{59}	—	January 1, 2008	Kitt Peak	Spacewatch	·	1.2 km	MPC · JPL
772217	2017 FX_{59}	—	March 14, 2004	Kitt Peak	Spacewatch	EUN	1.0 km	MPC · JPL
772218	2017 FC_{60}	—	February 26, 2011	Mount Lemmon	Mount Lemmon Survey	·	2.6 km	MPC · JPL
772219	2017 FG_{65}	—	October 2, 2006	Mount Lemmon	Mount Lemmon Survey	·	1.6 km	MPC · JPL
772220	2017 FN_{65}	—	February 22, 2017	Mount Lemmon	Mount Lemmon Survey	·	2.5 km	MPC · JPL
772221	2017 FZ_{65}	—	December 2, 2015	Haleakala	Pan-STARRS 1	·	940 m	MPC · JPL
772222	2017 FG_{66}	—	January 27, 2017	Haleakala	Pan-STARRS 1	(194)	920 m	MPC · JPL
772223	2017 FH_{67}	—	August 23, 2014	Haleakala	Pan-STARRS 1	·	1.6 km	MPC · JPL
772224	2017 FQ_{69}	—	February 1, 2017	Mount Lemmon	Mount Lemmon Survey	·	1.6 km	MPC · JPL
772225	2017 FL_{70}	—	September 11, 2015	Haleakala	Pan-STARRS 1	·	960 m	MPC · JPL
772226	2017 FD_{71}	—	February 27, 2008	Mount Lemmon	Mount Lemmon Survey	·	1.5 km	MPC · JPL
772227	2017 FJ_{71}	—	October 25, 2011	Haleakala	Pan-STARRS 1	·	1.0 km	MPC · JPL
772228	2017 FG_{73}	—	April 15, 2013	Haleakala	Pan-STARRS 1	·	1.3 km	MPC · JPL
772229	2017 FK_{75}	—	August 19, 2014	Haleakala	Pan-STARRS 1	·	1.3 km	MPC · JPL
772230	2017 FP_{77}	—	February 26, 2008	Mount Lemmon	Mount Lemmon Survey	·	1.2 km	MPC · JPL
772231	2017 FC_{82}	—	August 25, 2014	Haleakala	Pan-STARRS 1	·	1.2 km	MPC · JPL
772232	2017 FP_{85}	—	September 3, 2014	Mount Lemmon	Mount Lemmon Survey	·	1.6 km	MPC · JPL
772233	2017 FR_{85}	—	April 19, 2013	Mount Lemmon	Mount Lemmon Survey	·	1.3 km	MPC · JPL
772234	2017 FA_{92}	—	March 15, 2012	Mount Lemmon	Mount Lemmon Survey	·	1.6 km	MPC · JPL
772235	2017 FS_{95}	—	December 6, 2015	Kitt Peak	Spacewatch	·	2.4 km	MPC · JPL
772236	2017 FT_{97}	—	January 19, 2008	Mount Lemmon	Mount Lemmon Survey	·	1.5 km	MPC · JPL
772237	2017 FJ_{98}	—	February 25, 2012	Mount Lemmon	Mount Lemmon Survey	·	1.7 km	MPC · JPL
772238	2017 FH_{100}	—	January 29, 2011	Kitt Peak	Spacewatch	·	2.4 km	MPC · JPL
772239	2017 FS_{105}	—	January 2, 2012	Kitt Peak	Spacewatch	·	1.3 km	MPC · JPL
772240	2017 FG_{107}	—	March 25, 2007	Mount Lemmon	Mount Lemmon Survey	EOS	1.4 km	MPC · JPL
772241	2017 FH_{110}	—	March 19, 2017	Haleakala	Pan-STARRS 1	·	1.6 km	MPC · JPL
772242	2017 FC_{113}	—	August 20, 2014	Haleakala	Pan-STARRS 1	·	890 m	MPC · JPL
772243	2017 FW_{113}	—	September 27, 2006	Kitt Peak	Spacewatch	·	1.0 km	MPC · JPL
772244	2017 FQ_{115}	—	April 12, 2012	Haleakala	Pan-STARRS 1	·	1.2 km	MPC · JPL
772245	2017 FO_{116}	—	November 3, 2015	Haleakala	Pan-STARRS 1	·	1.0 km	MPC · JPL
772246	2017 FQ_{121}	—	October 15, 2007	Mount Lemmon	Mount Lemmon Survey	H	380 m	MPC · JPL
772247	2017 FE_{122}	—	January 31, 2006	Kitt Peak	Spacewatch	·	1.7 km	MPC · JPL
772248	2017 FO_{132}	—	June 27, 2014	Haleakala	Pan-STARRS 1	·	1.4 km	MPC · JPL
772249	2017 FV_{137}	—	March 29, 2012	Kitt Peak	Spacewatch	·	1.3 km	MPC · JPL
772250	2017 FR_{138}	—	March 26, 2003	Kitt Peak	Spacewatch	·	1.7 km	MPC · JPL
772251	2017 FW_{139}	—	February 28, 2008	Kitt Peak	Spacewatch	·	1.3 km	MPC · JPL
772252	2017 FQ_{141}	—	February 21, 2017	Haleakala	Pan-STARRS 1	·	1.3 km	MPC · JPL
772253	2017 FV_{141}	—	February 18, 2008	Mount Lemmon	Mount Lemmon Survey	·	1.3 km	MPC · JPL
772254	2017 FH_{144}	—	April 16, 2007	Mount Lemmon	Mount Lemmon Survey	·	1.3 km	MPC · JPL
772255	2017 FY_{146}	—	February 18, 2017	Haleakala	Pan-STARRS 1	L5	7.7 km	MPC · JPL
772256	2017 FK_{147}	—	March 18, 2013	Mount Lemmon	Mount Lemmon Survey	·	1.4 km	MPC · JPL
772257	2017 FB_{153}	—	February 22, 2017	Haleakala	Pan-STARRS 1	V	470 m	MPC · JPL
772258	2017 FG_{156}	—	March 31, 2017	Haleakala	Pan-STARRS 1	·	1.7 km	MPC · JPL
772259	2017 FF_{158}	—	March 5, 2017	Haleakala	Pan-STARRS 1	·	1.2 km	MPC · JPL
772260	2017 FT_{159}	—	September 20, 2014	Haleakala	Pan-STARRS 1	DOR	1.7 km	MPC · JPL
772261	2017 FB_{160}	—	July 3, 2014	Haleakala	Pan-STARRS 1	·	1.4 km	MPC · JPL
772262	2017 FN_{160}	—	February 3, 2012	Haleakala	Pan-STARRS 1	·	1.3 km	MPC · JPL
772263	2017 FB_{161}	—	December 3, 2015	Mount Lemmon	Mount Lemmon Survey	·	1.1 km	MPC · JPL
772264	2017 FJ_{161}	—	January 4, 2016	Haleakala	Pan-STARRS 1	·	1.5 km	MPC · JPL
772265	2017 FS_{161}	—	August 4, 2014	Haleakala	Pan-STARRS 1	·	1.6 km	MPC · JPL
772266	2017 FU_{161}	—	October 28, 2014	Haleakala	Pan-STARRS 1	·	2.0 km	MPC · JPL
772267	2017 FF_{162}	—	August 22, 2014	Haleakala	Pan-STARRS 1	·	1.4 km	MPC · JPL
772268	2017 FE_{163}	—	August 4, 2014	Haleakala	Pan-STARRS 1	·	810 m	MPC · JPL
772269	2017 FP_{173}	—	March 29, 2017	Haleakala	Pan-STARRS 1	EUN	1.1 km	MPC · JPL
772270	2017 FR_{173}	—	February 3, 2012	Haleakala	Pan-STARRS 1	·	1.2 km	MPC · JPL
772271	2017 FC_{174}	—	March 19, 2017	Haleakala	Pan-STARRS 1	EUN	760 m	MPC · JPL
772272	2017 FE_{174}	—	March 21, 2017	Haleakala	Pan-STARRS 1	·	1.3 km	MPC · JPL
772273	2017 FP_{174}	—	March 29, 2017	Haleakala	Pan-STARRS 1	·	1.3 km	MPC · JPL
772274	2017 FV_{176}	—	March 19, 2017	Mount Lemmon	Mount Lemmon Survey	·	1.5 km	MPC · JPL
772275	2017 FA_{178}	—	March 19, 2017	Mount Lemmon	Mount Lemmon Survey	·	2.1 km	MPC · JPL
772276	2017 FH_{178}	—	October 25, 2014	Mount Lemmon	Mount Lemmon Survey	AEO	870 m	MPC · JPL
772277	2017 FT_{185}	—	March 20, 2017	Haleakala	Pan-STARRS 1	PHO	770 m	MPC · JPL
772278	2017 FH_{188}	—	March 21, 2017	Haleakala	Pan-STARRS 1	EOS	1.6 km	MPC · JPL
772279	2017 FZ_{192}	—	December 13, 2015	Haleakala	Pan-STARRS 1	·	1.4 km	MPC · JPL
772280	2017 FE_{195}	—	January 27, 2012	Mount Lemmon	Mount Lemmon Survey	·	1.4 km	MPC · JPL
772281	2017 FO_{200}	—	March 27, 2017	Haleakala	Pan-STARRS 1	·	1.2 km	MPC · JPL
772282	2017 FR_{200}	—	March 21, 2017	Haleakala	Pan-STARRS 1	KOR	900 m	MPC · JPL
772283	2017 FQ_{203}	—	March 21, 2017	Haleakala	Pan-STARRS 1	·	2.0 km	MPC · JPL
772284	2017 FE_{206}	—	June 22, 2009	Mount Lemmon	Mount Lemmon Survey	JUN	810 m	MPC · JPL
772285	2017 FO_{216}	—	March 18, 2017	Mount Lemmon	Mount Lemmon Survey	·	1.8 km	MPC · JPL
772286	2017 FG_{223}	—	March 3, 2011	Mount Lemmon	Mount Lemmon Survey	·	1.5 km	MPC · JPL
772287	2017 GH_{2}	—	August 16, 2009	Kitt Peak	Spacewatch	·	1.7 km	MPC · JPL
772288	2017 GC_{3}	—	April 2, 2017	Haleakala	Pan-STARRS 1	·	1.3 km	MPC · JPL
772289	2017 GC_{10}	—	September 30, 2014	Mount Lemmon	Mount Lemmon Survey	·	1.5 km	MPC · JPL
772290	2017 GH_{10}	—	November 14, 2014	Kitt Peak	Spacewatch	·	2.4 km	MPC · JPL
772291	2017 GU_{10}	—	December 3, 2015	Mount Lemmon	Mount Lemmon Survey	·	1.4 km	MPC · JPL
772292	2017 GG_{11}	—	April 6, 2017	Mount Lemmon	Mount Lemmon Survey	·	1.3 km	MPC · JPL
772293	2017 GM_{11}	—	April 7, 2017	Mount Lemmon	Mount Lemmon Survey	·	2.0 km	MPC · JPL
772294	2017 GK_{12}	—	April 6, 2017	Haleakala	Pan-STARRS 1	BRG	1.3 km	MPC · JPL
772295	2017 GE_{14}	—	April 3, 2017	Haleakala	Pan-STARRS 1	MAR	760 m	MPC · JPL
772296	2017 GK_{14}	—	September 3, 2007	Catalina	CSS	·	1.6 km	MPC · JPL
772297	2017 GG_{17}	—	October 28, 2014	Haleakala	Pan-STARRS 1	·	1.5 km	MPC · JPL
772298	2017 GJ_{17}	—	April 6, 2017	Haleakala	Pan-STARRS 1	DOR	1.9 km	MPC · JPL
772299	2017 GP_{18}	—	April 1, 2017	Haleakala	Pan-STARRS 1	VER	1.9 km	MPC · JPL
772300	2017 GM_{22}	—	April 1, 2017	Haleakala	Pan-STARRS 1	·	1.2 km	MPC · JPL

== 772301–772400 ==
back to top

Designation			Discovery			Properties		Ref
Permanent	Provisional	Named after	Date	Site	Discoverer(s)	Category	Diam.	Ref
772301	2017 GJ_{24}	—	April 1, 2017	Haleakala	Pan-STARRS 1	·	1.6 km	MPC · JPL
772302	2017 GT_{24}	—	April 7, 2017	Haleakala	Pan-STARRS 1	·	2.4 km	MPC · JPL
772303	2017 GC_{29}	—	April 3, 2017	Haleakala	Pan-STARRS 1	615	1.1 km	MPC · JPL
772304	2017 HB_{13}	—	March 20, 2017	Haleakala	Pan-STARRS 1	WIT	760 m	MPC · JPL
772305	2017 HW_{17}	—	October 2, 2010	Mount Lemmon	Mount Lemmon Survey	HNS	940 m	MPC · JPL
772306	2017 HN_{20}	—	March 5, 2017	Haleakala	Pan-STARRS 1	·	1.5 km	MPC · JPL
772307	2017 HO_{24}	—	September 19, 2014	Haleakala	Pan-STARRS 1	·	1.4 km	MPC · JPL
772308	2017 HO_{25}	—	October 30, 2005	Kitt Peak	Spacewatch	·	1.4 km	MPC · JPL
772309	2017 HV_{25}	—	November 17, 2014	Haleakala	Pan-STARRS 1	·	2.7 km	MPC · JPL
772310	2017 HJ_{29}	—	October 12, 2010	Mount Lemmon	Mount Lemmon Survey	·	1.6 km	MPC · JPL
772311	2017 HQ_{29}	—	February 5, 2016	Haleakala	Pan-STARRS 1	·	1.5 km	MPC · JPL
772312	2017 HY_{29}	—	November 11, 2010	Mount Lemmon	Mount Lemmon Survey	HNS	850 m	MPC · JPL
772313	2017 HL_{30}	—	September 25, 2005	Kitt Peak	Spacewatch	·	1.4 km	MPC · JPL
772314	2017 HJ_{31}	—	March 10, 2016	Haleakala	Pan-STARRS 1	·	2.4 km	MPC · JPL
772315	2017 HT_{31}	—	April 29, 2008	Kitt Peak	Spacewatch	·	1.4 km	MPC · JPL
772316	2017 HJ_{32}	—	September 6, 2008	Kitt Peak	Spacewatch	·	2.5 km	MPC · JPL
772317	2017 HO_{32}	—	May 9, 2013	Haleakala	Pan-STARRS 1	·	830 m	MPC · JPL
772318	2017 HH_{34}	—	February 1, 2016	Haleakala	Pan-STARRS 1	·	2.2 km	MPC · JPL
772319	2017 HQ_{34}	—	August 15, 2013	Haleakala	Pan-STARRS 1	·	2.4 km	MPC · JPL
772320	2017 HZ_{35}	—	January 14, 2016	Haleakala	Pan-STARRS 1	EOS	1.5 km	MPC · JPL
772321	2017 HL_{37}	—	October 21, 2008	Mount Lemmon	Mount Lemmon Survey	·	2.3 km	MPC · JPL
772322	2017 HH_{38}	—	October 27, 2008	Mount Lemmon	Mount Lemmon Survey	·	2.1 km	MPC · JPL
772323	2017 HF_{40}	—	November 18, 2008	Kitt Peak	Spacewatch	THM	2.2 km	MPC · JPL
772324	2017 HU_{40}	—	January 7, 2016	Haleakala	Pan-STARRS 1	THM	2.0 km	MPC · JPL
772325	2017 HG_{43}	—	April 26, 2017	Haleakala	Pan-STARRS 1	·	2.0 km	MPC · JPL
772326	2017 HQ_{43}	—	March 19, 2017	Mount Lemmon	Mount Lemmon Survey	·	1.3 km	MPC · JPL
772327	2017 HU_{45}	—	January 17, 2016	Haleakala	Pan-STARRS 1	·	1.4 km	MPC · JPL
772328	2017 HV_{45}	—	January 17, 2009	Kitt Peak	Spacewatch	·	940 m	MPC · JPL
772329	2017 HR_{46}	—	November 17, 2014	Mount Lemmon	Mount Lemmon Survey	·	1.8 km	MPC · JPL
772330	2017 HC_{47}	—	February 11, 2016	Haleakala	Pan-STARRS 1	·	2.0 km	MPC · JPL
772331	2017 HF_{48}	—	October 22, 2003	Apache Point	SDSS	EOS	1.6 km	MPC · JPL
772332	2017 HT_{50}	—	June 7, 2013	Haleakala	Pan-STARRS 1	·	1.3 km	MPC · JPL
772333	2017 HW_{50}	—	February 25, 2017	Mount Lemmon	Mount Lemmon Survey	BAR	900 m	MPC · JPL
772334	2017 HY_{61}	—	February 21, 2012	Kitt Peak	Spacewatch	·	1.5 km	MPC · JPL
772335	2017 HH_{63}	—	April 26, 2017	Haleakala	Pan-STARRS 1	·	2.0 km	MPC · JPL
772336	2017 HP_{63}	—	April 20, 2017	Mount Lemmon	Mount Lemmon Survey	·	1.4 km	MPC · JPL
772337	2017 HN_{68}	—	April 26, 2017	Haleakala	Pan-STARRS 1	·	1.6 km	MPC · JPL
772338	2017 HY_{68}	—	April 27, 2017	Haleakala	Pan-STARRS 1	·	2.0 km	MPC · JPL
772339	2017 HE_{69}	—	April 30, 2017	Mount Lemmon	Mount Lemmon Survey	·	1.3 km	MPC · JPL
772340	2017 HK_{69}	—	April 28, 2017	Haleakala	Pan-STARRS 1	EUN	980 m	MPC · JPL
772341	2017 HP_{70}	—	April 28, 2017	Haleakala	Pan-STARRS 1	·	2.2 km	MPC · JPL
772342	2017 HA_{71}	—	April 16, 2017	Mount Lemmon	Mount Lemmon Survey	·	1.2 km	MPC · JPL
772343	2017 HD_{71}	—	April 27, 2017	Haleakala	Pan-STARRS 1	·	1.9 km	MPC · JPL
772344	2017 HM_{73}	—	April 26, 2017	Haleakala	Pan-STARRS 1	·	510 m	MPC · JPL
772345	2017 HD_{75}	—	April 1, 2017	Haleakala	Pan-STARRS 1	·	1.2 km	MPC · JPL
772346	2017 HS_{75}	—	February 26, 2008	Mount Lemmon	Mount Lemmon Survey	·	970 m	MPC · JPL
772347	2017 HM_{82}	—	April 27, 2017	Haleakala	Pan-STARRS 1	EUP	2.4 km	MPC · JPL
772348	2017 HP_{82}	—	April 26, 2017	Haleakala	Pan-STARRS 1	·	1.7 km	MPC · JPL
772349	2017 HY_{82}	—	April 28, 2017	Haleakala	Pan-STARRS 1	EMA	2.2 km	MPC · JPL
772350	2017 HK_{85}	—	April 26, 2017	Haleakala	Pan-STARRS 1	·	2.4 km	MPC · JPL
772351	2017 HV_{90}	—	April 26, 2017	Haleakala	Pan-STARRS 1	·	1.4 km	MPC · JPL
772352	2017 HU_{91}	—	January 4, 2016	Haleakala	Pan-STARRS 1	·	1.2 km	MPC · JPL
772353	2017 HP_{92}	—	April 27, 2017	Haleakala	Pan-STARRS 1	T_{j} (2.96)	3.0 km	MPC · JPL
772354	2017 HT_{94}	—	April 27, 2017	Haleakala	Pan-STARRS 1	EOS	1.4 km	MPC · JPL
772355	2017 JG_{5}	—	March 1, 2008	Kitt Peak	Spacewatch	·	1.5 km	MPC · JPL
772356	2017 JX_{5}	—	January 4, 2016	Haleakala	Pan-STARRS 1	·	2.3 km	MPC · JPL
772357	2017 JM_{6}	—	April 2, 2016	Haleakala	Pan-STARRS 1	TIR	1.8 km	MPC · JPL
772358	2017 JG_{7}	—	October 25, 2001	Apache Point	SDSS	·	2.3 km	MPC · JPL
772359	2017 JK_{7}	—	May 1, 2017	Mount Lemmon	Mount Lemmon Survey	·	1.4 km	MPC · JPL
772360	2017 JZ_{8}	—	May 4, 2017	Haleakala	Pan-STARRS 1	EUN	1.1 km	MPC · JPL
772361	2017 JE_{9}	—	May 6, 2017	Haleakala	Pan-STARRS 1	·	2.8 km	MPC · JPL
772362	2017 JL_{11}	—	May 1, 2017	Mount Lemmon	Mount Lemmon Survey	·	1.6 km	MPC · JPL
772363	2017 KK_{5}	—	December 18, 2007	Lulin	LUSS	BAR	910 m	MPC · JPL
772364	2017 KR_{8}	—	May 27, 2012	Mount Lemmon	Mount Lemmon Survey	·	1.5 km	MPC · JPL
772365	2017 KP_{13}	—	November 9, 2009	Mount Lemmon	Mount Lemmon Survey	·	1.9 km	MPC · JPL
772366	2017 KW_{16}	—	May 18, 2017	Haleakala	Pan-STARRS 1	·	2.6 km	MPC · JPL
772367	2017 KH_{20}	—	March 13, 2016	Haleakala	Pan-STARRS 1	·	1.7 km	MPC · JPL
772368	2017 KB_{22}	—	February 23, 2012	Mount Lemmon	Mount Lemmon Survey	·	1.2 km	MPC · JPL
772369	2017 KM_{26}	—	May 19, 2017	Mount Lemmon	Mount Lemmon Survey	·	2.2 km	MPC · JPL
772370	2017 KB_{28}	—	February 10, 2016	Haleakala	Pan-STARRS 1	BRA	1.3 km	MPC · JPL
772371	2017 KD_{29}	—	January 1, 2012	Mount Lemmon	Mount Lemmon Survey	·	1.2 km	MPC · JPL
772372	2017 KL_{30}	—	September 14, 2013	Haleakala	Pan-STARRS 1	·	2.5 km	MPC · JPL
772373	2017 KL_{35}	—	May 5, 2017	Mount Lemmon	Mount Lemmon Survey	·	1.9 km	MPC · JPL
772374	2017 KQ_{36}	—	September 14, 2013	Haleakala	Pan-STARRS 1	·	2.2 km	MPC · JPL
772375	2017 KF_{38}	—	July 24, 2012	Siding Spring	SSS	·	2.1 km	MPC · JPL
772376	2017 KV_{38}	—	May 21, 2017	Haleakala	Pan-STARRS 1	L4	7.9 km	MPC · JPL
772377	2017 KB_{39}	—	May 19, 2017	Haleakala	Pan-STARRS 1	THM	1.9 km	MPC · JPL
772378	2017 KW_{39}	—	May 29, 2017	Mount Lemmon	Mount Lemmon Survey	·	2.2 km	MPC · JPL
772379	2017 KQ_{41}	—	May 21, 2017	Haleakala	Pan-STARRS 1	·	1.6 km	MPC · JPL
772380	2017 KT_{44}	—	May 21, 2017	Haleakala	Pan-STARRS 1	L4	7.8 km	MPC · JPL
772381	2017 KV_{47}	—	May 21, 2017	Haleakala	Pan-STARRS 1	·	2.2 km	MPC · JPL
772382	2017 KK_{48}	—	June 20, 2013	Haleakala	Pan-STARRS 1	·	1.3 km	MPC · JPL
772383	2017 KU_{50}	—	May 21, 2017	Haleakala	Pan-STARRS 1	EOS	1.4 km	MPC · JPL
772384	2017 KN_{51}	—	December 11, 2014	Mount Lemmon	Mount Lemmon Survey	·	1.5 km	MPC · JPL
772385	2017 LJ_{1}	—	October 13, 2012	Kitt Peak	Spacewatch	·	1.2 km	MPC · JPL
772386	2017 LP_{2}	—	June 2, 2017	Cerro Tololo	M. Micheli, F. Valdes	·	1.3 km	MPC · JPL
772387	2017 LQ_{3}	—	August 19, 2012	Tincana	Zolnowski, M., Kusiak, M.	·	2.9 km	MPC · JPL
772388	2017 MK_{10}	—	June 23, 2017	Haleakala	Pan-STARRS 1	·	2.9 km	MPC · JPL
772389	2017 MF_{14}	—	June 22, 2017	Haleakala	Pan-STARRS 1	·	1.9 km	MPC · JPL
772390	2017 MH_{14}	—	June 24, 2017	Haleakala	Pan-STARRS 1	EOS	1.4 km	MPC · JPL
772391	2017 ML_{14}	—	June 22, 2017	Haleakala	Pan-STARRS 1	·	2.5 km	MPC · JPL
772392	2017 MM_{14}	—	June 24, 2017	Haleakala	Pan-STARRS 1	·	1.9 km	MPC · JPL
772393	2017 MM_{15}	—	June 24, 2017	Haleakala	Pan-STARRS 1	·	2.2 km	MPC · JPL
772394	2017 MO_{15}	—	June 24, 2017	Haleakala	Pan-STARRS 1	·	2.5 km	MPC · JPL
772395	2017 MO_{17}	—	June 29, 2017	Mount Lemmon	Mount Lemmon Survey	·	2.3 km	MPC · JPL
772396	2017 MB_{21}	—	June 25, 2017	Haleakala	Pan-STARRS 1	·	2.4 km	MPC · JPL
772397	2017 MV_{24}	—	June 21, 2017	Haleakala	Pan-STARRS 1	·	2.7 km	MPC · JPL
772398	2017 MR_{25}	—	June 24, 2017	Haleakala	Pan-STARRS 1	·	2.6 km	MPC · JPL
772399	2017 MZ_{26}	—	June 23, 2017	Haleakala	Pan-STARRS 1	·	3.1 km	MPC · JPL
772400	2017 MC_{37}	—	June 24, 2017	Haleakala	Pan-STARRS 1	LIX	2.3 km	MPC · JPL

== 772401–772500 ==
back to top

Designation			Discovery			Properties		Ref
Permanent	Provisional	Named after	Date	Site	Discoverer(s)	Category	Diam.	Ref
772401	2017 NL	—	December 29, 2014	Haleakala	Pan-STARRS 1	·	630 m	MPC · JPL
772402	2017 NM_{15}	—	July 5, 2017	Haleakala	Pan-STARRS 1	·	2.1 km	MPC · JPL
772403	2017 NR_{16}	—	July 5, 2017	Haleakala	Pan-STARRS 1	URS	2.6 km	MPC · JPL
772404	2017 NV_{17}	—	July 1, 2017	Haleakala	Pan-STARRS 1	·	2.8 km	MPC · JPL
772405	2017 NP_{19}	—	July 1, 2017	Haleakala	Pan-STARRS 1	EOS	1.4 km	MPC · JPL
772406	2017 NX_{19}	—	February 6, 2016	Haleakala	Pan-STARRS 1	·	720 m	MPC · JPL
772407	2017 OE_{3}	—	July 22, 2017	Haleakala	Pan-STARRS 1	·	1.2 km	MPC · JPL
772408	2017 OP_{5}	—	October 17, 2012	Mount Lemmon	Mount Lemmon Survey	·	2.3 km	MPC · JPL
772409	2017 OD_{11}	—	August 26, 2012	Haleakala	Pan-STARRS 1	·	1.9 km	MPC · JPL
772410	2017 OM_{14}	—	June 24, 2017	Haleakala	Pan-STARRS 1	LIX	2.8 km	MPC · JPL
772411	2017 OC_{15}	—	May 8, 2011	Mount Lemmon	Mount Lemmon Survey	·	1.9 km	MPC · JPL
772412	2017 OX_{16}	—	February 20, 2015	Haleakala	Pan-STARRS 1	·	3.1 km	MPC · JPL
772413	2017 OC_{18}	—	July 26, 2017	Haleakala	Pan-STARRS 1	·	2.2 km	MPC · JPL
772414	2017 OT_{21}	—	October 8, 2012	Haleakala	Pan-STARRS 1	·	2.2 km	MPC · JPL
772415	2017 OL_{23}	—	February 24, 2015	Haleakala	Pan-STARRS 1	·	2.7 km	MPC · JPL
772416	2017 OU_{23}	—	October 23, 2011	Kitt Peak	Spacewatch	·	420 m	MPC · JPL
772417	2017 OS_{30}	—	October 1, 2014	Haleakala	Pan-STARRS 1	·	570 m	MPC · JPL
772418	2017 OD_{31}	—	April 18, 2015	Cerro Tololo	DECam	·	2.8 km	MPC · JPL
772419	2017 OE_{31}	—	October 10, 2012	Kitt Peak	Spacewatch	·	2.5 km	MPC · JPL
772420	2017 OD_{34}	—	October 28, 2014	Haleakala	Pan-STARRS 1	·	590 m	MPC · JPL
772421	2017 OR_{36}	—	December 29, 2008	Kitt Peak	Spacewatch	·	510 m	MPC · JPL
772422	2017 OV_{37}	—	October 10, 2007	Mount Lemmon	Mount Lemmon Survey	·	560 m	MPC · JPL
772423	2017 OO_{43}	—	July 27, 2017	Haleakala	Pan-STARRS 1	·	2.6 km	MPC · JPL
772424	2017 OT_{43}	—	July 27, 2017	Haleakala	Pan-STARRS 1	·	1.9 km	MPC · JPL
772425	2017 OY_{43}	—	September 19, 2011	Haleakala	Pan-STARRS 1	·	2.4 km	MPC · JPL
772426	2017 OR_{44}	—	October 10, 2008	Mount Lemmon	Mount Lemmon Survey	·	1.6 km	MPC · JPL
772427	2017 OA_{45}	—	March 13, 2007	Kitt Peak	Spacewatch	EUN	1.2 km	MPC · JPL
772428	2017 OD_{51}	—	October 26, 2014	Mount Lemmon	Mount Lemmon Survey	·	580 m	MPC · JPL
772429	2017 OH_{53}	—	January 16, 2015	Haleakala	Pan-STARRS 1	HYG	2.0 km	MPC · JPL
772430	2017 OB_{56}	—	October 22, 2012	Haleakala	Pan-STARRS 1	·	2.4 km	MPC · JPL
772431	2017 OK_{56}	—	September 24, 2012	Mount Lemmon	Mount Lemmon Survey	EOS	1.6 km	MPC · JPL
772432	2017 OC_{59}	—	April 10, 2016	Haleakala	Pan-STARRS 1	·	2.5 km	MPC · JPL
772433	2017 OZ_{63}	—	March 23, 2015	Haleakala	Pan-STARRS 1	·	2.2 km	MPC · JPL
772434	2017 OA_{64}	—	August 2, 2011	Haleakala	Pan-STARRS 1	T_{j} (2.96)	3.2 km	MPC · JPL
772435	2017 OM_{74}	—	July 30, 2017	Haleakala	Pan-STARRS 1	V	440 m	MPC · JPL
772436	2017 OD_{82}	—	July 30, 2017	Haleakala	Pan-STARRS 1	·	1.9 km	MPC · JPL
772437	2017 OZ_{87}	—	July 26, 2017	Haleakala	Pan-STARRS 1	·	2.2 km	MPC · JPL
772438	2017 OH_{88}	—	July 25, 2017	Haleakala	Pan-STARRS 1	·	3.1 km	MPC · JPL
772439	2017 OQ_{88}	—	July 26, 2017	Haleakala	Pan-STARRS 1	·	1.3 km	MPC · JPL
772440	2017 OG_{89}	—	July 26, 2017	Haleakala	Pan-STARRS 1	·	1.6 km	MPC · JPL
772441	2017 OQ_{89}	—	July 25, 2017	Haleakala	Pan-STARRS 1	EOS	1.3 km	MPC · JPL
772442	2017 OU_{89}	—	July 29, 2017	Haleakala	Pan-STARRS 1	EOS	1.6 km	MPC · JPL
772443	2017 OK_{90}	—	July 26, 2017	Haleakala	Pan-STARRS 1	·	2.0 km	MPC · JPL
772444	2017 OQ_{90}	—	July 25, 2017	Haleakala	Pan-STARRS 1	VER	2.2 km	MPC · JPL
772445	2017 OV_{90}	—	April 17, 2015	Cerro Tololo	DECam	·	2.4 km	MPC · JPL
772446	2017 OW_{90}	—	July 26, 2017	Haleakala	Pan-STARRS 1	VER	2.1 km	MPC · JPL
772447	2017 OM_{92}	—	July 27, 2017	Haleakala	Pan-STARRS 1	·	2.4 km	MPC · JPL
772448	2017 OT_{92}	—	July 30, 2017	Haleakala	Pan-STARRS 1	·	580 m	MPC · JPL
772449	2017 OB_{94}	—	July 30, 2017	Haleakala	Pan-STARRS 1	·	2.0 km	MPC · JPL
772450	2017 OC_{94}	—	July 27, 2017	Haleakala	Pan-STARRS 1	·	2.1 km	MPC · JPL
772451	2017 OW_{95}	—	July 25, 2017	Haleakala	Pan-STARRS 1	·	2.3 km	MPC · JPL
772452	2017 OA_{97}	—	June 24, 2017	Haleakala	Pan-STARRS 1	·	1.9 km	MPC · JPL
772453	2017 OE_{100}	—	July 25, 2017	Haleakala	Pan-STARRS 1	·	2.3 km	MPC · JPL
772454	2017 OH_{100}	—	July 26, 2017	Haleakala	Pan-STARRS 1	·	2.3 km	MPC · JPL
772455	2017 OE_{101}	—	October 9, 2012	Mount Lemmon	Mount Lemmon Survey	EOS	1.6 km	MPC · JPL
772456	2017 OB_{102}	—	July 25, 2017	Haleakala	Pan-STARRS 1	·	3.2 km	MPC · JPL
772457	2017 OU_{104}	—	July 30, 2017	Haleakala	Pan-STARRS 1	·	2.0 km	MPC · JPL
772458	2017 OW_{104}	—	July 30, 2017	Haleakala	Pan-STARRS 1	·	560 m	MPC · JPL
772459	2017 OK_{106}	—	July 29, 2017	Haleakala	Pan-STARRS 1	·	1.9 km	MPC · JPL
772460	2017 OO_{113}	—	July 25, 2017	Haleakala	Pan-STARRS 1	·	1.9 km	MPC · JPL
772461	2017 OY_{113}	—	July 30, 2017	Haleakala	Pan-STARRS 1	·	1.9 km	MPC · JPL
772462	2017 OR_{114}	—	January 28, 2015	Haleakala	Pan-STARRS 1	·	2.2 km	MPC · JPL
772463	2017 OD_{115}	—	February 16, 2015	Haleakala	Pan-STARRS 1	·	1.8 km	MPC · JPL
772464	2017 OU_{120}	—	July 24, 2017	Haleakala	Pan-STARRS 1	EOS	1.4 km	MPC · JPL
772465	2017 OG_{122}	—	January 27, 2015	Haleakala	Pan-STARRS 1	·	1.9 km	MPC · JPL
772466	2017 OH_{123}	—	January 21, 2015	Haleakala	Pan-STARRS 1	EOS	1.4 km	MPC · JPL
772467	2017 OQ_{129}	—	July 25, 2017	Haleakala	Pan-STARRS 1	·	1.3 km	MPC · JPL
772468	2017 OK_{132}	—	July 25, 2017	Haleakala	Pan-STARRS 1	·	2.1 km	MPC · JPL
772469	2017 OM_{140}	—	January 20, 2015	Haleakala	Pan-STARRS 1	·	1.9 km	MPC · JPL
772470	2017 OB_{141}	—	July 30, 2017	Haleakala	Pan-STARRS 1	·	2.7 km	MPC · JPL
772471	2017 OG_{166}	—	January 22, 2015	Haleakala	Pan-STARRS 1	·	2.5 km	MPC · JPL
772472	2017 OV_{183}	—	January 27, 2015	Haleakala	Pan-STARRS 1	EOS	1.1 km	MPC · JPL
772473	2017 PF_{7}	—	October 23, 2012	Haleakala	Pan-STARRS 1	·	2.4 km	MPC · JPL
772474	2017 PH_{11}	—	August 28, 2000	Cerro Tololo	Deep Ecliptic Survey	·	2.2 km	MPC · JPL
772475	2017 PM_{11}	—	October 17, 2012	Haleakala	Pan-STARRS 1	·	1.9 km	MPC · JPL
772476	2017 PX_{12}	—	August 18, 2006	Kitt Peak	Spacewatch	·	2.2 km	MPC · JPL
772477	2017 PY_{13}	—	September 10, 2004	Kitt Peak	Spacewatch	·	1.2 km	MPC · JPL
772478	2017 PG_{23}	—	February 21, 2009	Kitt Peak	Spacewatch	THM	1.9 km	MPC · JPL
772479	2017 PF_{24}	—	August 1, 2017	Haleakala	Pan-STARRS 1	·	1.8 km	MPC · JPL
772480	2017 PX_{27}	—	July 4, 2017	Haleakala	Pan-STARRS 1	·	1.5 km	MPC · JPL
772481	2017 PR_{32}	—	January 18, 2015	Haleakala	Pan-STARRS 1	·	1.9 km	MPC · JPL
772482	2017 PE_{36}	—	January 15, 2015	Haleakala	Pan-STARRS 1	TRE	1.5 km	MPC · JPL
772483	2017 PN_{36}	—	February 23, 2015	Haleakala	Pan-STARRS 1	·	1.9 km	MPC · JPL
772484	2017 PN_{39}	—	April 11, 2016	Haleakala	Pan-STARRS 1	EOS	1.2 km	MPC · JPL
772485	2017 PQ_{39}	—	March 22, 2015	Mount Lemmon	Mount Lemmon Survey	·	2.1 km	MPC · JPL
772486	2017 PP_{43}	—	August 1, 2017	Haleakala	Pan-STARRS 1	·	620 m	MPC · JPL
772487	2017 PY_{46}	—	August 1, 2017	Haleakala	Pan-STARRS 1	·	2.6 km	MPC · JPL
772488	2017 PG_{50}	—	August 3, 2017	Haleakala	Pan-STARRS 1	·	2.7 km	MPC · JPL
772489	2017 PL_{50}	—	August 6, 2017	Haleakala	Pan-STARRS 1	·	540 m	MPC · JPL
772490	2017 PD_{52}	—	August 14, 2017	Haleakala	Pan-STARRS 1	·	3.0 km	MPC · JPL
772491	2017 PF_{53}	—	August 1, 2017	Haleakala	Pan-STARRS 1	·	2.1 km	MPC · JPL
772492	2017 PV_{53}	—	August 1, 2017	Haleakala	Pan-STARRS 1	ELF	2.5 km	MPC · JPL
772493	2017 PF_{58}	—	August 1, 2017	Haleakala	Pan-STARRS 1	·	2.2 km	MPC · JPL
772494	2017 PJ_{59}	—	August 1, 2017	Haleakala	Pan-STARRS 1	·	2.4 km	MPC · JPL
772495	2017 PK_{62}	—	January 20, 2015	Mount Lemmon	Mount Lemmon Survey	·	1.9 km	MPC · JPL
772496	2017 PW_{63}	—	August 1, 2017	Haleakala	Pan-STARRS 1	·	2.1 km	MPC · JPL
772497	2017 PZ_{68}	—	August 14, 2017	Haleakala	Pan-STARRS 1	·	2.5 km	MPC · JPL
772498	2017 QM_{4}	—	April 9, 2010	Kitt Peak	Spacewatch	·	430 m	MPC · JPL
772499	2017 QE_{6}	—	October 1, 2014	Haleakala	Pan-STARRS 1	·	490 m	MPC · JPL
772500	2017 QH_{8}	—	September 19, 2011	Mount Lemmon	Mount Lemmon Survey	·	3.2 km	MPC · JPL

== 772501–772600 ==
back to top

Designation			Discovery			Properties		Ref
Permanent	Provisional	Named after	Date	Site	Discoverer(s)	Category	Diam.	Ref
772501	2017 QM_{13}	—	September 19, 2014	Haleakala	Pan-STARRS 1	·	420 m	MPC · JPL
772502	2017 QV_{13}	—	October 9, 2010	Kitt Peak	Spacewatch	3:2	4.1 km	MPC · JPL
772503	2017 QP_{14}	—	July 5, 2017	Haleakala	Pan-STARRS 1	·	430 m	MPC · JPL
772504	2017 QP_{20}	—	November 2, 2007	Mount Lemmon	Mount Lemmon Survey	·	2.0 km	MPC · JPL
772505	2017 QT_{20}	—	November 10, 2010	Kitt Peak	Spacewatch	·	850 m	MPC · JPL
772506	2017 QA_{22}	—	January 27, 2015	Haleakala	Pan-STARRS 1	T_{j} (2.93)	2.7 km	MPC · JPL
772507	2017 QL_{23}	—	September 26, 2006	Kitt Peak	Spacewatch	NYS	890 m	MPC · JPL
772508	2017 QP_{24}	—	November 7, 2007	Mount Lemmon	Mount Lemmon Survey	·	460 m	MPC · JPL
772509	2017 QR_{25}	—	July 7, 2011	Siding Spring	SSS	·	3.0 km	MPC · JPL
772510	2017 QB_{26}	—	January 18, 2015	Haleakala	Pan-STARRS 1	·	2.6 km	MPC · JPL
772511	2017 QZ_{28}	—	August 19, 2006	Kitt Peak	Spacewatch	·	2.0 km	MPC · JPL
772512	2017 QD_{34}	—	January 18, 2015	Kitt Peak	Spacewatch	·	2.8 km	MPC · JPL
772513	2017 QU_{37}	—	February 9, 2010	Mount Lemmon	Mount Lemmon Survey	EOS	1.3 km	MPC · JPL
772514	2017 QT_{39}	—	July 30, 2017	Haleakala	Pan-STARRS 1	·	2.2 km	MPC · JPL
772515	2017 QG_{41}	—	October 6, 2012	Mount Lemmon	Mount Lemmon Survey	·	2.2 km	MPC · JPL
772516	2017 QR_{45}	—	January 22, 2015	Haleakala	Pan-STARRS 1	KOR	950 m	MPC · JPL
772517	2017 QS_{47}	—	October 8, 2012	Mount Lemmon	Mount Lemmon Survey	·	2.3 km	MPC · JPL
772518	2017 QN_{50}	—	August 1, 2017	Haleakala	Pan-STARRS 1	·	3.0 km	MPC · JPL
772519	2017 QK_{61}	—	October 28, 2014	Mount Lemmon	Mount Lemmon Survey	·	570 m	MPC · JPL
772520	2017 QO_{67}	—	September 17, 2012	Nogales	M. Schwartz, P. R. Holvorcem	·	2.1 km	MPC · JPL
772521	2017 QT_{71}	—	August 31, 2017	Haleakala	Pan-STARRS 1	·	2.2 km	MPC · JPL
772522	2017 QM_{73}	—	August 31, 2017	Haleakala	Pan-STARRS 1	·	2.7 km	MPC · JPL
772523	2017 QK_{75}	—	August 31, 2017	Haleakala	Pan-STARRS 1	·	2.4 km	MPC · JPL
772524	2017 QQ_{75}	—	September 5, 2000	Apache Point	SDSS	·	2.0 km	MPC · JPL
772525	2017 QB_{88}	—	August 18, 2017	Haleakala	Pan-STARRS 1	·	2.1 km	MPC · JPL
772526	2017 QA_{93}	—	August 31, 2017	Mount Lemmon	Mount Lemmon Survey	·	2.3 km	MPC · JPL
772527	2017 QR_{93}	—	August 31, 2017	Mount Lemmon	Mount Lemmon Survey	·	1.2 km	MPC · JPL
772528	2017 QQ_{94}	—	August 18, 2017	Haleakala	Pan-STARRS 1	·	2.8 km	MPC · JPL
772529	2017 QS_{95}	—	August 31, 2017	Haleakala	Pan-STARRS 1	·	580 m	MPC · JPL
772530	2017 QZ_{96}	—	August 31, 2017	Haleakala	Pan-STARRS 1	·	530 m	MPC · JPL
772531	2017 QA_{98}	—	August 28, 2017	Mount Lemmon	Mount Lemmon Survey	·	1.8 km	MPC · JPL
772532	2017 QK_{98}	—	August 31, 2017	Haleakala	Pan-STARRS 1	·	2.0 km	MPC · JPL
772533	2017 QQ_{98}	—	August 31, 2017	Haleakala	Pan-STARRS 1	·	1.6 km	MPC · JPL
772534	2017 QV_{98}	—	April 18, 2015	Cerro Tololo	DECam	·	2.5 km	MPC · JPL
772535	2017 QB_{99}	—	August 31, 2017	Haleakala	Pan-STARRS 1	·	2.7 km	MPC · JPL
772536	2017 QL_{101}	—	August 23, 2017	Haleakala	Pan-STARRS 1	VER	2.1 km	MPC · JPL
772537	2017 QA_{102}	—	August 24, 2017	Haleakala	Pan-STARRS 1	·	610 m	MPC · JPL
772538	2017 QM_{106}	—	August 17, 2017	Haleakala	Pan-STARRS 1	·	640 m	MPC · JPL
772539	2017 QN_{106}	—	April 18, 2015	Cerro Tololo	DECam	·	2.4 km	MPC · JPL
772540	2017 QL_{108}	—	August 23, 2017	Haleakala	Pan-STARRS 1	·	2.2 km	MPC · JPL
772541	2017 QS_{113}	—	March 1, 2009	Kitt Peak	Spacewatch	·	2.3 km	MPC · JPL
772542	2017 QU_{114}	—	December 31, 2008	Kitt Peak	Spacewatch	EOS	1.2 km	MPC · JPL
772543	2017 QV_{115}	—	August 16, 2017	Haleakala	Pan-STARRS 1	·	2.4 km	MPC · JPL
772544	2017 QC_{116}	—	August 18, 2017	Haleakala	Pan-STARRS 1	EOS	1.5 km	MPC · JPL
772545	2017 QN_{116}	—	April 19, 2015	Cerro Tololo	DECam	·	2.0 km	MPC · JPL
772546	2017 QE_{117}	—	May 7, 2016	Haleakala	Pan-STARRS 1	KOR	910 m	MPC · JPL
772547	2017 QH_{117}	—	August 31, 2017	Haleakala	Pan-STARRS 1	·	1.8 km	MPC · JPL
772548	2017 QJ_{117}	—	August 31, 2017	Haleakala	Pan-STARRS 1	·	2.4 km	MPC · JPL
772549	2017 QN_{117}	—	August 24, 2017	Haleakala	Pan-STARRS 1	·	2.3 km	MPC · JPL
772550	2017 QQ_{119}	—	May 1, 2016	Cerro Tololo	DECam	·	1.3 km	MPC · JPL
772551	2017 QU_{122}	—	August 18, 2017	Haleakala	Pan-STARRS 1	·	2.4 km	MPC · JPL
772552	2017 QG_{133}	—	August 24, 2017	Haleakala	Pan-STARRS 1	·	2.3 km	MPC · JPL
772553	2017 QZ_{139}	—	August 24, 2017	Haleakala	Pan-STARRS 1	·	1.7 km	MPC · JPL
772554	2017 QY_{149}	—	August 24, 2017	Haleakala	Pan-STARRS 1	·	2.2 km	MPC · JPL
772555	2017 QS_{151}	—	August 24, 2017	Haleakala	Pan-STARRS 1	·	2.1 km	MPC · JPL
772556	2017 QF_{163}	—	July 16, 2004	Cerro Tololo	Deep Ecliptic Survey	·	1.1 km	MPC · JPL
772557	2017 QQ_{166}	—	October 8, 2012	Haleakala	Pan-STARRS 1	·	2.1 km	MPC · JPL
772558	2017 QQ_{168}	—	January 29, 2014	Kitt Peak	Spacewatch	·	2.4 km	MPC · JPL
772559	2017 QR_{181}	—	August 18, 2017	Haleakala	Pan-STARRS 1	·	2.3 km	MPC · JPL
772560	2017 QB_{183}	—	August 18, 2017	Haleakala	Pan-STARRS 1	·	1.9 km	MPC · JPL
772561	2017 QM_{185}	—	August 18, 2017	Haleakala	Pan-STARRS 1	VER	1.7 km	MPC · JPL
772562	2017 RY_{3}	—	November 14, 2007	Kitt Peak	Spacewatch	·	1.6 km	MPC · JPL
772563	2017 RA_{4}	—	January 29, 2011	Kitt Peak	Spacewatch	(5)	830 m	MPC · JPL
772564	2017 RC_{12}	—	November 17, 2014	Haleakala	Pan-STARRS 1	·	510 m	MPC · JPL
772565	2017 RE_{17}	—	January 21, 2012	Kitt Peak	Spacewatch	·	520 m	MPC · JPL
772566	2017 RB_{18}	—	August 31, 2017	Mount Lemmon	Mount Lemmon Survey	·	2.4 km	MPC · JPL
772567	2017 RJ_{24}	—	January 20, 2015	Haleakala	Pan-STARRS 1	·	2.6 km	MPC · JPL
772568	2017 RV_{33}	—	February 29, 2016	Haleakala	Pan-STARRS 1	·	530 m	MPC · JPL
772569	2017 RJ_{38}	—	September 26, 2006	Mount Lemmon	Mount Lemmon Survey	·	2.2 km	MPC · JPL
772570	2017 RN_{44}	—	February 22, 2014	Mount Lemmon	Mount Lemmon Survey	·	2.5 km	MPC · JPL
772571	2017 RV_{48}	—	September 14, 2017	Haleakala	Pan-STARRS 1	AGN	770 m	MPC · JPL
772572	2017 RE_{55}	—	August 25, 2001	Kitt Peak	Spacewatch	·	1.8 km	MPC · JPL
772573	2017 RU_{55}	—	April 10, 2015	Mount Lemmon	Mount Lemmon Survey	·	1.4 km	MPC · JPL
772574	2017 RT_{57}	—	February 10, 2014	Haleakala	Pan-STARRS 1	·	2.0 km	MPC · JPL
772575	2017 RV_{58}	—	February 27, 2015	Haleakala	Pan-STARRS 1	·	1.8 km	MPC · JPL
772576	2017 RF_{61}	—	August 22, 2017	Haleakala	Pan-STARRS 1	·	1.3 km	MPC · JPL
772577	2017 RH_{65}	—	September 20, 2006	Kitt Peak	Spacewatch	MAS	520 m	MPC · JPL
772578	2017 RK_{65}	—	January 21, 2015	Haleakala	Pan-STARRS 1	·	1.8 km	MPC · JPL
772579	2017 RR_{77}	—	March 9, 2003	Kitt Peak	Deep Lens Survey	·	2.3 km	MPC · JPL
772580	2017 RE_{78}	—	October 22, 2008	Mount Lemmon	Mount Lemmon Survey	·	1.7 km	MPC · JPL
772581	2017 RK_{86}	—	December 28, 2011	Kitt Peak	Spacewatch	·	420 m	MPC · JPL
772582	2017 RL_{89}	—	January 23, 2006	Kitt Peak	Spacewatch	·	1.1 km	MPC · JPL
772583	2017 RH_{90}	—	September 15, 2017	Haleakala	Pan-STARRS 1	·	2.1 km	MPC · JPL
772584	2017 RQ_{92}	—	April 25, 2003	Kitt Peak	Spacewatch	·	500 m	MPC · JPL
772585	2017 RB_{93}	—	September 15, 2017	Haleakala	Pan-STARRS 1	HOF	1.8 km	MPC · JPL
772586	2017 RH_{95}	—	October 5, 2004	Kitt Peak	Spacewatch	·	490 m	MPC · JPL
772587	2017 RJ_{95}	—	November 8, 2013	Kitt Peak	Spacewatch	·	1.3 km	MPC · JPL
772588	2017 RW_{96}	—	September 27, 2003	Kitt Peak	Spacewatch	·	1.6 km	MPC · JPL
772589	2017 RW_{97}	—	February 4, 2009	Kitt Peak	Spacewatch	·	1.8 km	MPC · JPL
772590	2017 RZ_{100}	—	October 26, 2006	Mauna Kea	P. A. Wiegert	THM	1.8 km	MPC · JPL
772591	2017 RC_{102}	—	October 3, 2013	Haleakala	Pan-STARRS 1	·	810 m	MPC · JPL
772592	2017 RH_{109}	—	September 14, 2012	Mount Lemmon	Mount Lemmon Survey	EUP	2.8 km	MPC · JPL
772593	2017 RZ_{115}	—	September 14, 2017	Haleakala	Pan-STARRS 1	TIR	2.4 km	MPC · JPL
772594	2017 RF_{120}	—	September 2, 2017	Haleakala	Pan-STARRS 1	·	2.8 km	MPC · JPL
772595	2017 RD_{122}	—	September 14, 2017	Haleakala	Pan-STARRS 1	·	620 m	MPC · JPL
772596	2017 RD_{124}	—	September 14, 2017	Haleakala	Pan-STARRS 1	·	2.9 km	MPC · JPL
772597	2017 RH_{124}	—	September 13, 2017	Haleakala	Pan-STARRS 1	·	2.0 km	MPC · JPL
772598	2017 RV_{124}	—	September 13, 2017	Haleakala	Pan-STARRS 1	·	2.1 km	MPC · JPL
772599	2017 RJ_{126}	—	November 7, 2005	Mauna Kea	A. Boattini	·	430 m	MPC · JPL
772600	2017 RE_{131}	—	September 13, 2017	Haleakala	Pan-STARRS 1	·	2.3 km	MPC · JPL

== 772601–772700 ==
back to top

Designation			Discovery			Properties		Ref
Permanent	Provisional	Named after	Date	Site	Discoverer(s)	Category	Diam.	Ref
772601	2017 RH_{136}	—	April 18, 2015	Cerro Tololo	DECam	·	3.2 km	MPC · JPL
772602	2017 RC_{147}	—	September 8, 2017	Haleakala	Pan-STARRS 1	·	3.0 km	MPC · JPL
772603	2017 RG_{167}	—	September 8, 2007	Mount Lemmon	Mount Lemmon Survey	V	400 m	MPC · JPL
772604	2017 SG_{3}	—	October 10, 2012	Mount Lemmon	Mount Lemmon Survey	·	2.2 km	MPC · JPL
772605	2017 SJ_{6}	—	March 21, 2015	Haleakala	Pan-STARRS 1	·	2.4 km	MPC · JPL
772606	2017 SV_{6}	—	February 3, 2016	Haleakala	Pan-STARRS 1	·	630 m	MPC · JPL
772607	2017 SZ_{6}	—	January 31, 2009	Kitt Peak	Spacewatch	·	1.5 km	MPC · JPL
772608	2017 SP_{8}	—	March 27, 2012	Mount Lemmon	Mount Lemmon Survey	EUN	1.1 km	MPC · JPL
772609	2017 SZ_{8}	—	August 24, 2017	Haleakala	Pan-STARRS 1	·	2.5 km	MPC · JPL
772610	2017 SO_{15}	—	January 23, 2015	Haleakala	Pan-STARRS 1	·	1.1 km	MPC · JPL
772611	2017 SW_{15}	—	August 24, 2011	Haleakala	Pan-STARRS 1	·	2.1 km	MPC · JPL
772612	2017 SE_{21}	—	December 17, 2012	ESA OGS	ESA OGS	H	510 m	MPC · JPL
772613	2017 SA_{23}	—	November 6, 2012	Kitt Peak	Spacewatch	·	2.6 km	MPC · JPL
772614	2017 SL_{31}	—	May 12, 2013	Haleakala	Pan-STARRS 1	·	620 m	MPC · JPL
772615	2017 SD_{32}	—	November 17, 2014	Haleakala	Pan-STARRS 1	·	570 m	MPC · JPL
772616	2017 SH_{36}	—	November 1, 2007	Kitt Peak	Spacewatch	·	470 m	MPC · JPL
772617	2017 SX_{36}	—	July 2, 2011	Kitt Peak	Spacewatch	·	2.8 km	MPC · JPL
772618	2017 SD_{38}	—	September 17, 2003	Kitt Peak	Spacewatch	·	550 m	MPC · JPL
772619	2017 SX_{40}	—	March 2, 2006	Kitt Peak	Spacewatch	·	1.5 km	MPC · JPL
772620	2017 SK_{46}	—	August 28, 2006	Kitt Peak	Spacewatch	·	2.2 km	MPC · JPL
772621	2017 SW_{47}	—	October 12, 2013	Oukaïmeden	C. Rinner	·	1.3 km	MPC · JPL
772622	2017 SB_{54}	—	January 12, 2008	Mount Lemmon	Mount Lemmon Survey	·	2.1 km	MPC · JPL
772623	2017 SJ_{59}	—	March 11, 2014	Mount Lemmon	Mount Lemmon Survey	·	3.0 km	MPC · JPL
772624	2017 SJ_{62}	—	April 19, 2012	Mount Lemmon	Mount Lemmon Survey	RAF	680 m	MPC · JPL
772625	2017 SP_{69}	—	March 17, 2012	Mount Lemmon	Mount Lemmon Survey	·	440 m	MPC · JPL
772626	2017 SU_{69}	—	October 11, 2012	Mount Lemmon	Mount Lemmon Survey	·	1.3 km	MPC · JPL
772627	2017 SA_{72}	—	November 22, 2014	Haleakala	Pan-STARRS 1	·	530 m	MPC · JPL
772628	2017 SN_{73}	—	November 21, 2014	Mount Lemmon	Mount Lemmon Survey	·	460 m	MPC · JPL
772629	2017 ST_{75}	—	January 30, 2006	Kitt Peak	Spacewatch	·	1.2 km	MPC · JPL
772630	2017 SA_{77}	—	October 7, 2008	Mount Lemmon	Mount Lemmon Survey	·	1.6 km	MPC · JPL
772631	2017 SC_{80}	—	November 1, 2013	Kitt Peak	Spacewatch	·	1.0 km	MPC · JPL
772632	2017 SV_{92}	—	September 15, 2004	Kitt Peak	Spacewatch	·	1.0 km	MPC · JPL
772633	2017 SZ_{93}	—	July 28, 2011	Haleakala	Pan-STARRS 1	·	2.4 km	MPC · JPL
772634	2017 SB_{95}	—	November 20, 2014	Mount Lemmon	Mount Lemmon Survey	·	530 m	MPC · JPL
772635	2017 SM_{99}	—	May 13, 2005	Mount Lemmon	Mount Lemmon Survey	·	2.0 km	MPC · JPL
772636	2017 SW_{99}	—	February 6, 2014	Mount Lemmon	Mount Lemmon Survey	·	2.1 km	MPC · JPL
772637	2017 SP_{100}	—	March 2, 2009	Kitt Peak	Spacewatch	·	2.2 km	MPC · JPL
772638	2017 SW_{101}	—	September 29, 2003	Kitt Peak	Spacewatch	·	1.5 km	MPC · JPL
772639	2017 SC_{103}	—	August 24, 2011	La Sagra	OAM	·	3.1 km	MPC · JPL
772640	2017 SA_{108}	—	April 3, 2016	Haleakala	Pan-STARRS 1	V	470 m	MPC · JPL
772641	2017 SK_{109}	—	September 30, 2014	Mount Lemmon	Mount Lemmon Survey	·	540 m	MPC · JPL
772642	2017 SG_{114}	—	January 24, 2015	Haleakala	Pan-STARRS 1	·	520 m	MPC · JPL
772643	2017 SB_{115}	—	November 5, 2007	Kitt Peak	Spacewatch	·	490 m	MPC · JPL
772644	2017 SK_{124}	—	August 31, 2017	Haleakala	Pan-STARRS 1	·	460 m	MPC · JPL
772645	2017 SW_{125}	—	February 13, 2002	Kitt Peak	Spacewatch	·	560 m	MPC · JPL
772646	2017 SF_{138}	—	September 24, 2017	Haleakala	Pan-STARRS 1	·	680 m	MPC · JPL
772647	2017 SP_{158}	—	November 19, 2006	Kitt Peak	Spacewatch	·	2.4 km	MPC · JPL
772648	2017 SQ_{158}	—	September 16, 2017	Haleakala	Pan-STARRS 1	·	2.0 km	MPC · JPL
772649	2017 SJ_{173}	—	September 24, 2017	Haleakala	Pan-STARRS 1	·	650 m	MPC · JPL
772650	2017 SH_{186}	—	September 26, 2017	Haleakala	Pan-STARRS 1	·	2.2 km	MPC · JPL
772651	2017 SK_{189}	—	September 18, 2017	Haleakala	Pan-STARRS 1	·	2.7 km	MPC · JPL
772652	2017 SQ_{196}	—	May 1, 2016	Haleakala	Pan-STARRS 1	V	350 m	MPC · JPL
772653	2017 SR_{197}	—	December 30, 2013	Mount Lemmon	Mount Lemmon Survey	·	1.3 km	MPC · JPL
772654	2017 SK_{198}	—	September 18, 2017	Haleakala	Pan-STARRS 1	EOS	1.4 km	MPC · JPL
772655	2017 SN_{198}	—	April 18, 2015	Mount Lemmon	Mount Lemmon Survey	EOS	1.5 km	MPC · JPL
772656	2017 SG_{200}	—	September 24, 2017	Haleakala	Pan-STARRS 1	·	460 m	MPC · JPL
772657	2017 SU_{200}	—	September 26, 2006	Mount Lemmon	Mount Lemmon Survey	·	620 m	MPC · JPL
772658	2017 SV_{201}	—	September 26, 2017	Haleakala	Pan-STARRS 1	·	1.7 km	MPC · JPL
772659	2017 SE_{203}	—	September 26, 2017	Haleakala	Pan-STARRS 1	·	560 m	MPC · JPL
772660	2017 SU_{206}	—	September 19, 2017	Haleakala	Pan-STARRS 1	·	2.2 km	MPC · JPL
772661	2017 SB_{209}	—	September 22, 2017	Haleakala	Pan-STARRS 1	EOS	1.3 km	MPC · JPL
772662	2017 SS_{209}	—	September 26, 2017	Haleakala	Pan-STARRS 1	·	2.3 km	MPC · JPL
772663	2017 SG_{219}	—	September 25, 2017	Haleakala	Pan-STARRS 1	VER	1.9 km	MPC · JPL
772664	2017 SV_{222}	—	September 21, 2001	Kitt Peak	Spacewatch	·	1.3 km	MPC · JPL
772665	2017 SS_{223}	—	September 24, 2017	Haleakala	Pan-STARRS 1	·	1.5 km	MPC · JPL
772666	2017 SR_{224}	—	September 19, 2017	Haleakala	Pan-STARRS 1	EOS	1.4 km	MPC · JPL
772667	2017 SG_{225}	—	September 23, 2017	Haleakala	Pan-STARRS 1	·	500 m	MPC · JPL
772668	2017 SP_{226}	—	September 24, 2017	Haleakala	Pan-STARRS 1	·	540 m	MPC · JPL
772669	2017 SG_{227}	—	September 26, 2017	Mount Lemmon	Mount Lemmon Survey	·	2.4 km	MPC · JPL
772670	2017 SB_{242}	—	January 25, 2015	Haleakala	Pan-STARRS 1	·	1.8 km	MPC · JPL
772671	2017 SW_{242}	—	September 25, 2017	Haleakala	Pan-STARRS 1	·	2.2 km	MPC · JPL
772672	2017 SZ_{242}	—	September 29, 2017	Haleakala	Pan-STARRS 1	·	1.5 km	MPC · JPL
772673	2017 SN_{244}	—	September 23, 2017	Haleakala	Pan-STARRS 1	(2076)	510 m	MPC · JPL
772674	2017 SP_{249}	—	September 26, 2017	Haleakala	Pan-STARRS 1	·	2.8 km	MPC · JPL
772675	2017 SS_{249}	—	September 22, 2017	Haleakala	Pan-STARRS 1	·	2.3 km	MPC · JPL
772676	2017 SF_{250}	—	September 22, 2017	Haleakala	Pan-STARRS 1	·	2.1 km	MPC · JPL
772677	2017 SQ_{250}	—	August 24, 2011	Haleakala	Pan-STARRS 1	THM	1.8 km	MPC · JPL
772678	2017 SP_{251}	—	September 17, 2017	Haleakala	Pan-STARRS 1	·	2.3 km	MPC · JPL
772679	2017 ST_{252}	—	September 25, 2017	Haleakala	Pan-STARRS 1	VER	1.8 km	MPC · JPL
772680	2017 SM_{254}	—	September 23, 2017	Haleakala	Pan-STARRS 1	·	1.4 km	MPC · JPL
772681	2017 SF_{257}	—	September 29, 2017	Haleakala	Pan-STARRS 1	·	1.5 km	MPC · JPL
772682	2017 SO_{258}	—	September 26, 2017	Haleakala	Pan-STARRS 1	KOR	1.0 km	MPC · JPL
772683	2017 SH_{283}	—	November 13, 2012	Mount Lemmon	Mount Lemmon Survey	·	2.2 km	MPC · JPL
772684	2017 SW_{297}	—	September 21, 2012	Mount Lemmon	Mount Lemmon Survey	·	1.4 km	MPC · JPL
772685	2017 SS_{303}	—	January 13, 2008	Kitt Peak	Spacewatch	LIX	2.2 km	MPC · JPL
772686	2017 SN_{320}	—	October 16, 2012	Mount Lemmon	Mount Lemmon Survey	·	2.2 km	MPC · JPL
772687	2017 TW_{1}	—	October 4, 2008	La Sagra	OAM	·	1.7 km	MPC · JPL
772688	2017 TH_{8}	—	October 9, 2007	Mount Lemmon	Mount Lemmon Survey	·	540 m	MPC · JPL
772689	2017 TS_{9}	—	October 12, 2010	Mount Lemmon	Mount Lemmon Survey	·	920 m	MPC · JPL
772690	2017 TV_{12}	—	October 21, 2012	Haleakala	Pan-STARRS 1	EOS	1.7 km	MPC · JPL
772691	2017 TJ_{13}	—	May 18, 2015	Haleakala	Pan-STARRS 1	·	2.6 km	MPC · JPL
772692	2017 TL_{15}	—	September 19, 2017	Haleakala	Pan-STARRS 1	·	600 m	MPC · JPL
772693	2017 TJ_{19}	—	October 19, 2006	Kitt Peak	Spacewatch	·	2.2 km	MPC · JPL
772694	2017 TL_{24}	—	October 13, 2017	Mount Lemmon	Mount Lemmon Survey	·	3.0 km	MPC · JPL
772695	2017 TS_{24}	—	October 10, 2017	Cerro Paranal	Gaia Ground Based Optical Tracking	V	510 m	MPC · JPL
772696	2017 TF_{25}	—	October 11, 2017	Haleakala	Pan-STARRS 1	·	1.6 km	MPC · JPL
772697	2017 TR_{25}	—	October 15, 2017	Mount Lemmon	Mount Lemmon Survey	ELF	3.3 km	MPC · JPL
772698	2017 TT_{26}	—	October 15, 2017	Mount Lemmon	Mount Lemmon Survey	·	1.5 km	MPC · JPL
772699	2017 TX_{26}	—	October 1, 2017	Haleakala	Pan-STARRS 1	·	490 m	MPC · JPL
772700	2017 TQ_{29}	—	September 21, 2017	Haleakala	Pan-STARRS 1	·	2.4 km	MPC · JPL

== 772701–772800 ==
back to top

Designation			Discovery			Properties		Ref
Permanent	Provisional	Named after	Date	Site	Discoverer(s)	Category	Diam.	Ref
772701	2017 TZ_{32}	—	October 15, 2017	Mount Lemmon	Mount Lemmon Survey	·	1.6 km	MPC · JPL
772702	2017 TL_{45}	—	October 10, 2017	Haleakala	Pan-STARRS 1	·	2.4 km	MPC · JPL
772703	2017 UC_{13}	—	May 23, 2012	Mount Lemmon	Mount Lemmon Survey	·	1.7 km	MPC · JPL
772704	2017 UP_{13}	—	December 1, 2014	Haleakala	Pan-STARRS 1	·	470 m	MPC · JPL
772705	2017 UQ_{13}	—	October 24, 2014	Mount Lemmon	Mount Lemmon Survey	·	540 m	MPC · JPL
772706	2017 UM_{16}	—	September 15, 2006	Kitt Peak	Spacewatch	·	760 m	MPC · JPL
772707	2017 UD_{20}	—	November 24, 2014	Mount Lemmon	Mount Lemmon Survey	·	600 m	MPC · JPL
772708	2017 UP_{27}	—	June 11, 2016	Mount Lemmon	Mount Lemmon Survey	(5651)	1.9 km	MPC · JPL
772709	2017 UK_{30}	—	November 14, 2007	Kitt Peak	Spacewatch	·	550 m	MPC · JPL
772710	2017 UX_{39}	—	August 30, 2011	Haleakala	Pan-STARRS 1	·	2.6 km	MPC · JPL
772711	2017 UW_{44}	—	November 12, 2010	Kitt Peak	Spacewatch	·	670 m	MPC · JPL
772712	2017 UK_{48}	—	September 23, 2011	Haleakala	Pan-STARRS 1	·	2.4 km	MPC · JPL
772713	2017 UJ_{49}	—	August 8, 2016	Haleakala	Pan-STARRS 1	·	1.5 km	MPC · JPL
772714	2017 UO_{69}	—	October 22, 2017	Mount Lemmon	Mount Lemmon Survey	·	650 m	MPC · JPL
772715	2017 UN_{78}	—	February 27, 2015	Haleakala	Pan-STARRS 1	NYS	720 m	MPC · JPL
772716	2017 UN_{83}	—	August 2, 2011	Haleakala	Pan-STARRS 1	EOS	1.3 km	MPC · JPL
772717	2017 UM_{87}	—	October 28, 2017	Haleakala	Pan-STARRS 1	·	540 m	MPC · JPL
772718	2017 UB_{88}	—	October 28, 2017	Haleakala	Pan-STARRS 1	·	490 m	MPC · JPL
772719	2017 UO_{88}	—	October 19, 2017	Haleakala	Pan-STARRS 1	·	580 m	MPC · JPL
772720	2017 UV_{90}	—	October 22, 2017	Mount Lemmon	Mount Lemmon Survey	·	2.7 km	MPC · JPL
772721	2017 UJ_{91}	—	October 27, 2017	Mount Lemmon	Mount Lemmon Survey	BAP	620 m	MPC · JPL
772722	2017 UL_{94}	—	October 19, 2017	Haleakala	Pan-STARRS 1	·	2.9 km	MPC · JPL
772723	2017 UF_{96}	—	January 2, 2009	Kitt Peak	Spacewatch	TRE	2.0 km	MPC · JPL
772724	2017 UL_{96}	—	October 27, 2017	Haleakala	Pan-STARRS 1	·	650 m	MPC · JPL
772725	2017 UW_{97}	—	October 28, 2017	Haleakala	Pan-STARRS 1	·	1.5 km	MPC · JPL
772726	2017 UX_{99}	—	May 21, 2015	Haleakala	Pan-STARRS 1	VER	1.9 km	MPC · JPL
772727	2017 UM_{101}	—	October 28, 2017	Haleakala	Pan-STARRS 1	EOS	1.3 km	MPC · JPL
772728	2017 UJ_{104}	—	May 21, 2015	Haleakala	Pan-STARRS 1	·	1.4 km	MPC · JPL
772729	2017 UV_{104}	—	October 28, 2017	Haleakala	Pan-STARRS 1	·	2.4 km	MPC · JPL
772730	2017 UH_{105}	—	September 17, 2017	Haleakala	Pan-STARRS 1	·	2.5 km	MPC · JPL
772731	2017 UT_{107}	—	October 27, 2017	Mount Lemmon	Mount Lemmon Survey	KOR	1 km	MPC · JPL
772732	2017 UU_{107}	—	October 28, 2017	Haleakala	Pan-STARRS 1	·	2.4 km	MPC · JPL
772733	2017 UX_{118}	—	October 28, 2017	Haleakala	Pan-STARRS 1	·	870 m	MPC · JPL
772734	2017 UW_{135}	—	October 28, 2017	Haleakala	Pan-STARRS 1	·	480 m	MPC · JPL
772735	2017 UX_{137}	—	July 5, 2016	Haleakala	Pan-STARRS 1	·	1.8 km	MPC · JPL
772736	2017 UX_{138}	—	September 25, 2017	Haleakala	Pan-STARRS 1	·	2.4 km	MPC · JPL
772737	2017 UB_{139}	—	May 19, 2015	Haleakala	Pan-STARRS 1	·	2.3 km	MPC · JPL
772738	2017 UO_{139}	—	April 23, 2014	Cerro Tololo	DECam	·	2.5 km	MPC · JPL
772739	2017 UY_{139}	—	September 29, 2011	Mount Lemmon	Mount Lemmon Survey	·	2.4 km	MPC · JPL
772740	2017 UZ_{185}	—	February 26, 2014	Haleakala	Pan-STARRS 1	·	2.3 km	MPC · JPL
772741	2017 VQ_{5}	—	November 6, 2007	Kitt Peak	Spacewatch	·	580 m	MPC · JPL
772742	2017 VB_{7}	—	August 24, 2011	Haleakala	Pan-STARRS 1	EOS	1.5 km	MPC · JPL
772743	2017 VT_{17}	—	February 10, 2014	Haleakala	Pan-STARRS 1	·	3.1 km	MPC · JPL
772744	2017 VJ_{24}	—	June 7, 2016	Haleakala	Pan-STARRS 1	·	2.2 km	MPC · JPL
772745	2017 VR_{24}	—	July 18, 2006	Siding Spring	SSS	·	740 m	MPC · JPL
772746	2017 VH_{31}	—	October 9, 2007	Mount Lemmon	Mount Lemmon Survey	·	530 m	MPC · JPL
772747	2017 VC_{37}	—	April 5, 2014	Haleakala	Pan-STARRS 1	·	2.8 km	MPC · JPL
772748	2017 VN_{42}	—	April 18, 2015	Cerro Tololo	DECam	·	1.4 km	MPC · JPL
772749	2017 VA_{43}	—	November 14, 2017	Mount Lemmon	Mount Lemmon Survey	·	650 m	MPC · JPL
772750	2017 VO_{45}	—	November 15, 2017	Mount Lemmon	Mount Lemmon Survey	·	750 m	MPC · JPL
772751	2017 VT_{51}	—	November 10, 2017	Haleakala	Pan-STARRS 1	LUT	3.0 km	MPC · JPL
772752	2017 WX_{5}	—	February 8, 2008	Kitt Peak	Spacewatch	·	2.4 km	MPC · JPL
772753	2017 WD_{11}	—	September 16, 2010	Mount Lemmon	Mount Lemmon Survey	·	550 m	MPC · JPL
772754	2017 WV_{15}	—	April 30, 2012	Kitt Peak	Spacewatch	PHO	670 m	MPC · JPL
772755	2017 WT_{16}	—	December 21, 2014	Haleakala	Pan-STARRS 1	·	470 m	MPC · JPL
772756	2017 WZ_{17}	—	October 14, 2010	Mount Lemmon	Mount Lemmon Survey	·	490 m	MPC · JPL
772757	2017 WC_{20}	—	October 30, 2013	Haleakala	Pan-STARRS 1	·	900 m	MPC · JPL
772758	2017 WA_{23}	—	April 2, 2016	Mount Lemmon	Mount Lemmon Survey	·	680 m	MPC · JPL
772759	2017 WP_{27}	—	January 22, 2015	Haleakala	Pan-STARRS 1	·	380 m	MPC · JPL
772760	2017 WR_{31}	—	November 28, 2017	Mount Lemmon	Mount Lemmon Survey	PHO	680 m	MPC · JPL
772761	2017 WA_{39}	—	November 21, 2017	Haleakala	Pan-STARRS 1	·	800 m	MPC · JPL
772762	2017 WB_{40}	—	April 22, 2009	Kitt Peak	Spacewatch	·	560 m	MPC · JPL
772763	2017 WD_{43}	—	November 18, 2017	Haleakala	Pan-STARRS 1	·	1.7 km	MPC · JPL
772764	2017 WE_{43}	—	November 16, 2017	Mount Lemmon	Mount Lemmon Survey	·	2.5 km	MPC · JPL
772765	2017 WM_{43}	—	November 21, 2017	Haleakala	Pan-STARRS 1	·	1.1 km	MPC · JPL
772766	2017 WT_{47}	—	February 10, 2014	Haleakala	Pan-STARRS 1	·	2.7 km	MPC · JPL
772767	2017 WT_{49}	—	November 24, 2017	Haleakala	Pan-STARRS 1	·	880 m	MPC · JPL
772768	2017 WG_{51}	—	October 28, 2005	Mount Lemmon	Mount Lemmon Survey	·	2.1 km	MPC · JPL
772769	2017 WY_{52}	—	November 16, 2017	Mount Lemmon	Mount Lemmon Survey	·	720 m	MPC · JPL
772770	2017 WB_{53}	—	November 18, 2017	Haleakala	Pan-STARRS 1	·	540 m	MPC · JPL
772771	2017 WW_{53}	—	November 27, 2017	Mount Lemmon	Mount Lemmon Survey	·	1.8 km	MPC · JPL
772772	2017 XZ	—	January 22, 2015	Haleakala	Pan-STARRS 1	·	830 m	MPC · JPL
772773	2017 XT_{5}	—	May 21, 2015	Cerro Tololo	DECam	·	1.7 km	MPC · JPL
772774	2017 XC_{6}	—	October 21, 2007	Mount Lemmon	Mount Lemmon Survey	·	1.3 km	MPC · JPL
772775	2017 XV_{8}	—	October 27, 2017	Mount Lemmon	Mount Lemmon Survey	·	430 m	MPC · JPL
772776	2017 XL_{14}	—	November 27, 2010	Mount Lemmon	Mount Lemmon Survey	·	530 m	MPC · JPL
772777	2017 XQ_{15}	—	November 2, 2010	Kitt Peak	Spacewatch	·	570 m	MPC · JPL
772778	2017 XU_{20}	—	November 6, 2010	Kitt Peak	Spacewatch	NYS	490 m	MPC · JPL
772779	2017 XM_{22}	—	October 27, 2017	Mount Lemmon	Mount Lemmon Survey	·	740 m	MPC · JPL
772780	2017 XK_{23}	—	October 16, 2007	Mount Lemmon	Mount Lemmon Survey	·	580 m	MPC · JPL
772781	2017 XZ_{23}	—	January 4, 2013	Cerro Tololo	D. E. Trilling, R. L. Allen	·	2.9 km	MPC · JPL
772782	2017 XT_{30}	—	August 3, 2016	Haleakala	Pan-STARRS 1	·	1.3 km	MPC · JPL
772783	2017 XS_{31}	—	July 14, 2013	Haleakala	Pan-STARRS 1	·	630 m	MPC · JPL
772784	2017 XZ_{35}	—	November 27, 2017	Mount Lemmon	Mount Lemmon Survey	·	2.4 km	MPC · JPL
772785	2017 XG_{38}	—	April 18, 2012	Mount Lemmon	Mount Lemmon Survey	·	650 m	MPC · JPL
772786	2017 XD_{41}	—	March 14, 2012	Kitt Peak	Spacewatch	·	870 m	MPC · JPL
772787	2017 XQ_{45}	—	December 14, 2010	Mount Lemmon	Mount Lemmon Survey	·	700 m	MPC · JPL
772788	2017 XD_{46}	—	January 13, 2015	Haleakala	Pan-STARRS 1	·	610 m	MPC · JPL
772789	2017 XV_{49}	—	February 25, 2015	Kitt Peak	Spacewatch	·	420 m	MPC · JPL
772790	2017 XW_{49}	—	April 25, 2015	Haleakala	Pan-STARRS 1	·	1.5 km	MPC · JPL
772791	2017 XU_{51}	—	October 20, 2006	Kitt Peak	Spacewatch	·	860 m	MPC · JPL
772792	2017 XT_{52}	—	September 27, 2011	Mount Lemmon	Mount Lemmon Survey	·	2.6 km	MPC · JPL
772793	2017 XR_{54}	—	December 13, 2010	Mount Lemmon	Mount Lemmon Survey	MAS	450 m	MPC · JPL
772794	2017 XM_{59}	—	January 3, 2014	Kitt Peak	Spacewatch	·	1.3 km	MPC · JPL
772795	2017 XD_{67}	—	December 13, 2017	Mount Lemmon	Mount Lemmon Survey	·	1.1 km	MPC · JPL
772796	2017 XF_{69}	—	December 12, 2017	Haleakala	Pan-STARRS 1	·	740 m	MPC · JPL
772797	2017 XA_{71}	—	April 18, 2015	Mount Lemmon	Mount Lemmon Survey	·	970 m	MPC · JPL
772798	2017 XX_{71}	—	December 8, 2017	Haleakala	Pan-STARRS 1	PHO	780 m	MPC · JPL
772799	2017 XU_{72}	—	December 14, 2017	Mount Lemmon	Mount Lemmon Survey	·	690 m	MPC · JPL
772800	2017 XW_{78}	—	December 12, 2017	Haleakala	Pan-STARRS 1	VER	1.8 km	MPC · JPL

== 772801–772900 ==
back to top

Designation			Discovery			Properties		Ref
Permanent	Provisional	Named after	Date	Site	Discoverer(s)	Category	Diam.	Ref
772801	2017 XG_{89}	—	December 14, 2017	Mount Lemmon	Mount Lemmon Survey	·	770 m	MPC · JPL
772802	2017 YY_{14}	—	December 15, 2010	Mount Lemmon	Mount Lemmon Survey	·	810 m	MPC · JPL
772803	2017 YZ_{27}	—	December 25, 2017	Mount Lemmon	Mount Lemmon Survey	·	1.3 km	MPC · JPL
772804	2017 YM_{28}	—	December 29, 2017	Haleakala	Pan-STARRS 1	·	1.6 km	MPC · JPL
772805	2017 YY_{29}	—	November 17, 2006	Mount Lemmon	Mount Lemmon Survey	·	760 m	MPC · JPL
772806	2017 YS_{31}	—	December 23, 2017	Haleakala	Pan-STARRS 1	·	920 m	MPC · JPL
772807	2017 YM_{32}	—	May 20, 2015	Cerro Tololo	DECam	·	960 m	MPC · JPL
772808	2017 YB_{35}	—	December 27, 2017	Mount Lemmon	Mount Lemmon Survey	·	810 m	MPC · JPL
772809	2017 YU_{35}	—	December 23, 2017	Haleakala	Pan-STARRS 1	·	600 m	MPC · JPL
772810	2017 YT_{40}	—	February 9, 2014	Mount Lemmon	Mount Lemmon Survey	·	880 m	MPC · JPL
772811	2017 YU_{41}	—	October 21, 2016	Mount Lemmon	Mount Lemmon Survey	·	2.2 km	MPC · JPL
772812	2017 YK_{42}	—	January 21, 2014	Mount Lemmon	Mount Lemmon Survey	·	920 m	MPC · JPL
772813	2017 YL_{43}	—	December 29, 2017	Mount Lemmon	Mount Lemmon Survey	EUN	770 m	MPC · JPL
772814	2017 YJ_{46}	—	October 23, 2011	Haleakala	Pan-STARRS 1	·	1.8 km	MPC · JPL
772815	2017 YS_{51}	—	December 24, 2017	Mount Lemmon	Mount Lemmon Survey	·	1.1 km	MPC · JPL
772816	2017 YG_{56}	—	April 18, 2015	Cerro Tololo	DECam	·	920 m	MPC · JPL
772817	2017 YS_{60}	—	December 28, 2017	Mount Lemmon	Mount Lemmon Survey	·	780 m	MPC · JPL
772818	2017 YO_{62}	—	October 6, 2016	Haleakala	Pan-STARRS 1	VER	1.9 km	MPC · JPL
772819	2017 YX_{62}	—	August 28, 2016	Mount Lemmon	Mount Lemmon Survey	T_{j} (2.94)	2.8 km	MPC · JPL
772820	2018 AA	—	April 1, 2008	Mount Lemmon	Mount Lemmon Survey	PHO	880 m	MPC · JPL
772821	2018 AA_{3}	—	November 21, 2003	Kitt Peak	Spacewatch	·	690 m	MPC · JPL
772822	2018 AK_{8}	—	June 15, 2015	Mount Lemmon	Mount Lemmon Survey	·	970 m	MPC · JPL
772823	2018 AF_{11}	—	December 25, 2013	Mount Lemmon	Mount Lemmon Survey	·	1.3 km	MPC · JPL
772824	2018 AW_{14}	—	May 11, 2015	Mount Lemmon	Mount Lemmon Survey	·	960 m	MPC · JPL
772825	2018 AD_{17}	—	October 5, 2013	Kitt Peak	Spacewatch	NYS	680 m	MPC · JPL
772826	2018 AH_{19}	—	January 15, 2018	Mount Lemmon	Mount Lemmon Survey	·	990 m	MPC · JPL
772827	2018 AK_{22}	—	January 15, 2018	Mount Lemmon	Mount Lemmon Survey	·	1.3 km	MPC · JPL
772828	2018 AQ_{27}	—	January 13, 2018	Mount Lemmon	Mount Lemmon Survey	·	1.0 km	MPC · JPL
772829	2018 AZ_{27}	—	January 12, 2018	Haleakala	Pan-STARRS 1	·	940 m	MPC · JPL
772830	2018 AX_{28}	—	January 15, 2018	Haleakala	Pan-STARRS 1	·	2.3 km	MPC · JPL
772831	2018 AY_{28}	—	January 13, 2018	Mount Lemmon	Mount Lemmon Survey	PHO	870 m	MPC · JPL
772832	2018 AG_{29}	—	January 15, 2018	Mount Lemmon	Mount Lemmon Survey	PHO	600 m	MPC · JPL
772833	2018 AN_{34}	—	May 20, 2015	Cerro Tololo	DECam	·	740 m	MPC · JPL
772834	2018 AD_{36}	—	May 20, 2015	Cerro Tololo	DECam	MAS	540 m	MPC · JPL
772835	2018 AO_{36}	—	January 15, 2018	Haleakala	Pan-STARRS 1	EUN	990 m	MPC · JPL
772836	2018 AU_{39}	—	January 11, 2018	Haleakala	Pan-STARRS 1	VER	1.8 km	MPC · JPL
772837	2018 AJ_{41}	—	January 14, 2018	Mount Lemmon	Mount Lemmon Survey	·	1.2 km	MPC · JPL
772838	2018 AE_{42}	—	January 11, 2018	Haleakala	Pan-STARRS 1	·	1.3 km	MPC · JPL
772839	2018 AD_{44}	—	September 16, 2009	Mount Lemmon	Mount Lemmon Survey	MAS	560 m	MPC · JPL
772840	2018 AL_{44}	—	April 5, 2014	Haleakala	Pan-STARRS 1	·	1.6 km	MPC · JPL
772841	2018 AR_{44}	—	January 15, 2018	Mount Lemmon	Mount Lemmon Survey	·	970 m	MPC · JPL
772842	2018 AY_{65}	—	January 15, 2018	Haleakala	Pan-STARRS 1	·	1.1 km	MPC · JPL
772843	2018 AK_{73}	—	January 15, 2018	Haleakala	Pan-STARRS 1	·	1.5 km	MPC · JPL
772844	2018 BZ	—	December 13, 2017	Mount Lemmon	Mount Lemmon Survey	·	1.1 km	MPC · JPL
772845	2018 BY_{7}	—	October 9, 2008	Mount Lemmon	Mount Lemmon Survey	3:2	3.4 km	MPC · JPL
772846	2018 BM_{21}	—	January 16, 2018	Haleakala	Pan-STARRS 1	·	940 m	MPC · JPL
772847	2018 BS_{21}	—	January 16, 2018	Haleakala	Pan-STARRS 1	·	770 m	MPC · JPL
772848	2018 BK_{22}	—	January 20, 2018	Haleakala	Pan-STARRS 1	·	860 m	MPC · JPL
772849	2018 BP_{22}	—	January 16, 2018	Haleakala	Pan-STARRS 1	·	650 m	MPC · JPL
772850	2018 BB_{23}	—	January 16, 2018	Haleakala	Pan-STARRS 1	·	1.0 km	MPC · JPL
772851	2018 BO_{27}	—	January 16, 2018	Haleakala	Pan-STARRS 1	·	1.5 km	MPC · JPL
772852	2018 BX_{27}	—	January 23, 2018	Mount Lemmon	Mount Lemmon Survey	·	1.2 km	MPC · JPL
772853	2018 BU_{28}	—	January 23, 2018	Mount Lemmon	Mount Lemmon Survey	·	1.7 km	MPC · JPL
772854	2018 BX_{29}	—	July 25, 2015	Haleakala	Pan-STARRS 1	·	2.5 km	MPC · JPL
772855	2018 BU_{35}	—	January 20, 2018	Haleakala	Pan-STARRS 1	MAR	810 m	MPC · JPL
772856	2018 BS_{40}	—	January 23, 2018	Mount Lemmon	Mount Lemmon Survey	PHO	710 m	MPC · JPL
772857	2018 BF_{44}	—	January 20, 2018	Haleakala	Pan-STARRS 1	L5	7.2 km	MPC · JPL
772858	2018 BE_{48}	—	February 28, 2014	Haleakala	Pan-STARRS 1	·	1.2 km	MPC · JPL
772859	2018 CM_{8}	—	February 2, 2005	Kitt Peak	Spacewatch	·	1.5 km	MPC · JPL
772860	2018 CK_{12}	—	March 1, 2009	Mount Lemmon	Mount Lemmon Survey	DOR	2.0 km	MPC · JPL
772861	2018 CJ_{18}	—	February 12, 2018	Haleakala	Pan-STARRS 1	·	1.5 km	MPC · JPL
772862	2018 CL_{18}	—	February 12, 2018	Haleakala	Pan-STARRS 1	·	870 m	MPC · JPL
772863	2018 CT_{20}	—	February 12, 2018	Haleakala	Pan-STARRS 1	·	2.5 km	MPC · JPL
772864	2018 CD_{22}	—	February 12, 2018	Haleakala	Pan-STARRS 1	·	1.1 km	MPC · JPL
772865	2018 CD_{23}	—	February 12, 2018	Haleakala	Pan-STARRS 1	NYS	830 m	MPC · JPL
772866	2018 CA_{24}	—	September 21, 2011	Mount Lemmon	Mount Lemmon Survey	L5	6.2 km	MPC · JPL
772867	2018 CE_{31}	—	February 12, 2018	Haleakala	Pan-STARRS 1	·	820 m	MPC · JPL
772868	2018 DP_{4}	—	February 8, 2000	Apache Point	SDSS	·	1.7 km	MPC · JPL
772869	2018 DY_{7}	—	December 10, 2009	Mount Lemmon	Mount Lemmon Survey	·	840 m	MPC · JPL
772870	2018 DA_{8}	—	February 25, 2018	Mount Lemmon	Mount Lemmon Survey	V	480 m	MPC · JPL
772871	2018 ES_{4}	—	January 14, 2018	Haleakala	Pan-STARRS 1	L5	6.2 km	MPC · JPL
772872	2018 EX_{4}	—	August 30, 2016	Haleakala	Pan-STARRS 1	BRG	1.1 km	MPC · JPL
772873	2018 FR_{6}	—	May 4, 2014	Mount Lemmon	Mount Lemmon Survey	·	1.3 km	MPC · JPL
772874	2018 FU_{6}	—	February 25, 2007	Kitt Peak	Spacewatch	·	700 m	MPC · JPL
772875	2018 FA_{7}	—	February 2, 2006	Kitt Peak	Spacewatch	·	2.4 km	MPC · JPL
772876	2018 FN_{9}	—	March 17, 2018	Haleakala	Pan-STARRS 1	L5	6.4 km	MPC · JPL
772877	2018 FY_{11}	—	March 17, 2018	Haleakala	Pan-STARRS 1	·	1.5 km	MPC · JPL
772878	2018 FL_{12}	—	July 24, 2015	Haleakala	Pan-STARRS 1	·	970 m	MPC · JPL
772879	2018 FR_{12}	—	October 11, 2015	XuYi	PMO NEO Survey Program	·	1.5 km	MPC · JPL
772880	2018 FB_{14}	—	February 26, 2014	Mount Lemmon	Mount Lemmon Survey	·	800 m	MPC · JPL
772881	2018 FF_{14}	—	October 22, 2016	Mount Lemmon	Mount Lemmon Survey	·	1.1 km	MPC · JPL
772882	2018 FG_{14}	—	September 6, 2015	Kitt Peak	Spacewatch	·	1.3 km	MPC · JPL
772883	2018 FA_{18}	—	May 9, 2014	Haleakala	Pan-STARRS 1	·	1.1 km	MPC · JPL
772884	2018 FL_{18}	—	May 17, 2007	Kitt Peak	Spacewatch	·	850 m	MPC · JPL
772885	2018 FP_{18}	—	March 24, 2009	Kitt Peak	Spacewatch	·	1.6 km	MPC · JPL
772886	2018 FP_{19}	—	April 2, 2009	Kitt Peak	Spacewatch	·	1.7 km	MPC · JPL
772887	2018 FB_{20}	—	March 10, 2007	Kitt Peak	Spacewatch	NYS	880 m	MPC · JPL
772888	2018 FO_{25}	—	January 1, 2014	Kitt Peak	Spacewatch	·	750 m	MPC · JPL
772889	2018 FQ_{26}	—	September 18, 2006	Kitt Peak	Spacewatch	·	1.3 km	MPC · JPL
772890	2018 FB_{28}	—	November 23, 2016	Mount Lemmon	Mount Lemmon Survey	(5)	850 m	MPC · JPL
772891	2018 FX_{31}	—	March 18, 2018	Haleakala	Pan-STARRS 1	·	1.0 km	MPC · JPL
772892	2018 FO_{35}	—	July 24, 2015	Haleakala	Pan-STARRS 1	NYS	870 m	MPC · JPL
772893	2018 FD_{36}	—	June 24, 2014	Mount Lemmon	Mount Lemmon Survey	·	1.1 km	MPC · JPL
772894	2018 FW_{36}	—	March 16, 2018	Mount Lemmon	Mount Lemmon Survey	·	970 m	MPC · JPL
772895	2018 FF_{39}	—	March 21, 2018	Mount Lemmon	Mount Lemmon Survey	·	870 m	MPC · JPL
772896	2018 FJ_{42}	—	January 17, 2009	Kitt Peak	Spacewatch	·	1.1 km	MPC · JPL
772897	2018 FM_{42}	—	September 14, 2007	Mount Lemmon	Mount Lemmon Survey	·	1.1 km	MPC · JPL
772898	2018 FR_{43}	—	April 28, 2014	Cerro Tololo	DECam	·	960 m	MPC · JPL
772899	2018 FW_{43}	—	April 5, 2014	Haleakala	Pan-STARRS 1	MAR	680 m	MPC · JPL
772900	2018 FO_{51}	—	May 23, 2014	Haleakala	Pan-STARRS 1	·	1.4 km	MPC · JPL

== 772901–773000 ==
back to top

Designation			Discovery			Properties		Ref
Permanent	Provisional	Named after	Date	Site	Discoverer(s)	Category	Diam.	Ref
772901	2018 FJ_{58}	—	March 18, 2018	Haleakala	Pan-STARRS 1	AGN	810 m	MPC · JPL
772902	2018 FG_{60}	—	March 18, 2018	Haleakala	Pan-STARRS 1	L5	7.5 km	MPC · JPL
772903	2018 FZ_{74}	—	January 28, 2016	Haleakala	Pan-STARRS 1	L5	6.5 km	MPC · JPL
772904	2018 GT_{2}	—	January 20, 2013	Kitt Peak	Spacewatch	BAR	840 m	MPC · JPL
772905	2018 GQ_{6}	—	May 4, 2014	Kitt Peak	Spacewatch	·	1.0 km	MPC · JPL
772906	2018 GX_{8}	—	October 7, 2015	Westfield	International Astronomical Search Collaboration	·	1.4 km	MPC · JPL
772907	2018 GK_{10}	—	April 13, 2018	Haleakala	Pan-STARRS 1	·	1.1 km	MPC · JPL
772908	2018 GW_{12}	—	September 11, 2010	Mount Lemmon	Mount Lemmon Survey	·	1.7 km	MPC · JPL
772909	2018 GY_{14}	—	April 12, 2018	Haleakala	Pan-STARRS 1	·	1.4 km	MPC · JPL
772910	2018 HQ_{2}	—	April 4, 2014	Haleakala	Pan-STARRS 1	·	980 m	MPC · JPL
772911	2018 HT_{5}	—	April 16, 2018	Mount Lemmon	Mount Lemmon Survey	JUN	840 m	MPC · JPL
772912	2018 HU_{6}	—	June 21, 2010	Mount Lemmon	Mount Lemmon Survey	·	920 m	MPC · JPL
772913	2018 HM_{7}	—	April 16, 2018	Haleakala	Pan-STARRS 1	·	1.2 km	MPC · JPL
772914	2018 HS_{7}	—	April 23, 2018	Cerro Paranal	Gaia Ground Based Optical Tracking	·	1.4 km	MPC · JPL
772915	2018 HS_{8}	—	February 14, 2013	Catalina	CSS	·	1.6 km	MPC · JPL
772916	2018 HR_{9}	—	November 21, 2007	Mount Lemmon	Mount Lemmon Survey	·	1.5 km	MPC · JPL
772917	2018 JU_{3}	—	February 12, 2018	Haleakala	Pan-STARRS 1	·	1.6 km	MPC · JPL
772918	2018 JY_{9}	—	May 14, 2018	Mount Lemmon	Mount Lemmon Survey	EUN	910 m	MPC · JPL
772919	2018 JH_{12}	—	December 21, 2012	Mount Lemmon	Mount Lemmon Survey	·	1.0 km	MPC · JPL
772920	2018 KQ_{2}	—	July 1, 2013	Haleakala	Pan-STARRS 1	H	350 m	MPC · JPL
772921	2018 KV_{8}	—	May 18, 2018	Mount Lemmon	Mount Lemmon Survey	·	1.4 km	MPC · JPL
772922	2018 KU_{14}	—	July 6, 2014	Haleakala	Pan-STARRS 1	·	1.7 km	MPC · JPL
772923	2018 LV	—	November 19, 2014	Haleakala	Pan-STARRS 1	H	340 m	MPC · JPL
772924	2018 LA_{2}	—	March 30, 2008	Kitt Peak	Spacewatch	·	1.6 km	MPC · JPL
772925	2018 LK_{6}	—	October 6, 2016	Haleakala	Pan-STARRS 1	H	320 m	MPC · JPL
772926	2018 LK_{7}	—	August 23, 2014	Haleakala	Pan-STARRS 1	·	1.6 km	MPC · JPL
772927	2018 LR_{24}	—	June 15, 2018	Haleakala	Pan-STARRS 1	L4	7.1 km	MPC · JPL
772928	2018 LZ_{24}	—	June 8, 2018	Haleakala	Pan-STARRS 1	·	2.3 km	MPC · JPL
772929	2018 LF_{25}	—	June 14, 2018	Haleakala	Pan-STARRS 1	EUN	960 m	MPC · JPL
772930	2018 LB_{26}	—	June 12, 2018	Mount Lemmon	Mount Lemmon Survey	·	2.0 km	MPC · JPL
772931	2018 LK_{27}	—	October 1, 2006	Kitt Peak	Spacewatch	·	1.5 km	MPC · JPL
772932	2018 LT_{28}	—	June 15, 2018	Haleakala	Pan-STARRS 1	EUN	1.0 km	MPC · JPL
772933	2018 LU_{35}	—	June 15, 2018	Haleakala	Pan-STARRS 1	L4	7.2 km	MPC · JPL
772934	2018 LA_{37}	—	December 1, 2015	Haleakala	Pan-STARRS 1	HNS	980 m	MPC · JPL
772935	2018 LE_{40}	—	January 14, 2016	Haleakala	Pan-STARRS 1	·	1.4 km	MPC · JPL
772936	2018 MG_{1}	—	January 5, 2013	Kitt Peak	Spacewatch	·	1.0 km	MPC · JPL
772937	2018 MT_{2}	—	December 6, 2015	Haleakala	Pan-STARRS 1	·	2.4 km	MPC · JPL
772938	2018 MT_{3}	—	August 18, 2006	Kitt Peak	Spacewatch	·	2.8 km	MPC · JPL
772939	2018 MG_{8}	—	February 11, 2014	Mount Lemmon	Mount Lemmon Survey	PHO	860 m	MPC · JPL
772940	2018 MR_{12}	—	June 23, 2018	Haleakala	Pan-STARRS 1	H	440 m	MPC · JPL
772941	2018 MC_{14}	—	June 17, 2018	Haleakala	Pan-STARRS 1	·	1.5 km	MPC · JPL
772942	2018 MD_{14}	—	June 23, 2018	Haleakala	Pan-STARRS 1	·	1.9 km	MPC · JPL
772943	2018 MW_{14}	—	June 17, 2018	Haleakala	Pan-STARRS 1	EOS	1.4 km	MPC · JPL
772944	2018 MV_{15}	—	June 14, 2018	Mount Lemmon	Mount Lemmon Survey	EUN	880 m	MPC · JPL
772945	2018 MR_{17}	—	June 21, 2018	Haleakala	Pan-STARRS 1	EOS	1.5 km	MPC · JPL
772946	2018 MT_{18}	—	June 18, 2018	Haleakala	Pan-STARRS 1	·	1.4 km	MPC · JPL
772947	2018 MJ_{20}	—	August 27, 2014	Haleakala	Pan-STARRS 1	·	1.4 km	MPC · JPL
772948	2018 MA_{25}	—	June 21, 2018	Haleakala	Pan-STARRS 1	EOS	1.3 km	MPC · JPL
772949	2018 MF_{29}	—	June 18, 2018	Haleakala	Pan-STARRS 1	·	1.1 km	MPC · JPL
772950	2018 NW_{5}	—	February 11, 2016	Haleakala	Pan-STARRS 1	EOS	1.5 km	MPC · JPL
772951	2018 NU_{7}	—	November 28, 2016	Haleakala	Pan-STARRS 1	·	1.0 km	MPC · JPL
772952	2018 NW_{7}	—	April 10, 2022	Haleakala	Pan-STARRS 2	AGN	800 m	MPC · JPL
772953	2018 NE_{11}	—	April 3, 2017	Haleakala	Pan-STARRS 1	·	2.0 km	MPC · JPL
772954	2018 NF_{12}	—	November 17, 2014	Haleakala	Pan-STARRS 1	EOS	1.2 km	MPC · JPL
772955	2018 NV_{15}	—	July 11, 2018	Haleakala	Pan-STARRS 1	·	2.2 km	MPC · JPL
772956	2018 NZ_{17}	—	July 11, 2018	Haleakala	Pan-STARRS 1	EUN	940 m	MPC · JPL
772957	2018 NJ_{18}	—	September 15, 2007	Catalina	CSS	·	2.0 km	MPC · JPL
772958	2018 NX_{19}	—	April 30, 2012	Kitt Peak	Spacewatch	EOS	1.5 km	MPC · JPL
772959	2018 NZ_{21}	—	July 8, 2018	Haleakala	Pan-STARRS 1	BRA	1.1 km	MPC · JPL
772960	2018 NA_{23}	—	July 13, 2018	Haleakala	Pan-STARRS 1	·	1.3 km	MPC · JPL
772961	2018 NC_{23}	—	July 13, 2018	Haleakala	Pan-STARRS 1	EOS	1.3 km	MPC · JPL
772962	2018 NK_{23}	—	July 10, 2018	Haleakala	Pan-STARRS 1	·	1.3 km	MPC · JPL
772963	2018 NV_{23}	—	July 11, 2018	Haleakala	Pan-STARRS 2	·	3.1 km	MPC · JPL
772964	2018 NJ_{26}	—	July 11, 2018	Haleakala	Pan-STARRS 1	·	1.4 km	MPC · JPL
772965	2018 NZ_{26}	—	July 10, 2018	Haleakala	Pan-STARRS 1	·	1.6 km	MPC · JPL
772966	2018 NB_{27}	—	February 5, 2016	Mount Lemmon	Mount Lemmon Survey	EOS	1.3 km	MPC · JPL
772967	2018 NQ_{28}	—	July 12, 2018	Haleakala	Pan-STARRS 2	L4	7.7 km	MPC · JPL
772968	2018 NS_{28}	—	July 10, 2018	Haleakala	Pan-STARRS 2	L4	7.4 km	MPC · JPL
772969	2018 NE_{30}	—	July 8, 2018	Haleakala	Pan-STARRS 1	·	1.5 km	MPC · JPL
772970	2018 NO_{30}	—	April 3, 2016	Haleakala	Pan-STARRS 1	EOS	1.4 km	MPC · JPL
772971	2018 NC_{33}	—	June 18, 2018	Haleakala	Pan-STARRS 1	·	1.9 km	MPC · JPL
772972	2018 NX_{35}	—	July 12, 2018	Haleakala	Pan-STARRS 2	·	1.3 km	MPC · JPL
772973	2018 NC_{39}	—	July 12, 2018	Haleakala	Pan-STARRS 1	·	1.7 km	MPC · JPL
772974	2018 NE_{39}	—	July 8, 2018	Haleakala	Pan-STARRS 1	·	1.2 km	MPC · JPL
772975	2018 NK_{39}	—	July 12, 2018	Haleakala	Pan-STARRS 1	EOS	1.5 km	MPC · JPL
772976	2018 NR_{41}	—	July 12, 2018	Haleakala	Pan-STARRS 1	·	1.5 km	MPC · JPL
772977	2018 NB_{42}	—	July 9, 2018	Haleakala	Pan-STARRS 1	·	1.8 km	MPC · JPL
772978	2018 NK_{42}	—	April 18, 2015	Cerro Tololo	DECam	L4	5.9 km	MPC · JPL
772979	2018 NW_{43}	—	June 18, 2018	Haleakala	Pan-STARRS 1	·	1.5 km	MPC · JPL
772980	2018 NU_{44}	—	July 10, 2018	Haleakala	Pan-STARRS 1	·	2.0 km	MPC · JPL
772981	2018 NU_{70}	—	July 10, 2018	Haleakala	Pan-STARRS 1	L4	5.4 km	MPC · JPL
772982	2018 OM_{3}	—	March 12, 2016	Haleakala	Pan-STARRS 1	EOS	1.5 km	MPC · JPL
772983	2018 PK_{1}	—	January 30, 2016	Mount Lemmon	Mount Lemmon Survey	·	2.5 km	MPC · JPL
772984	2018 PY_{1}	—	February 14, 2012	Haleakala	Pan-STARRS 1	·	1.6 km	MPC · JPL
772985	2018 PP_{2}	—	December 18, 2015	Mount Lemmon	Mount Lemmon Survey	·	1.3 km	MPC · JPL
772986	2018 PT_{2}	—	November 27, 2014	Haleakala	Pan-STARRS 1	VER	2.3 km	MPC · JPL
772987	2018 PY_{11}	—	January 29, 2016	Mount Lemmon	Mount Lemmon Survey	·	1.4 km	MPC · JPL
772988	2018 PR_{14}	—	April 26, 2017	Haleakala	Pan-STARRS 1	·	2.2 km	MPC · JPL
772989	2018 PG_{15}	—	December 29, 2014	Haleakala	Pan-STARRS 1	·	1.4 km	MPC · JPL
772990	2018 PR_{17}	—	January 21, 2014	Haleakala	Pan-STARRS 1	H	410 m	MPC · JPL
772991	2018 PS_{25}	—	January 17, 2016	Haleakala	Pan-STARRS 1	·	2.5 km	MPC · JPL
772992	2018 PV_{25}	—	October 4, 2002	Socorro	LINEAR	·	1.8 km	MPC · JPL
772993	2018 PP_{26}	—	November 6, 2008	Mount Lemmon	Mount Lemmon Survey	·	2.1 km	MPC · JPL
772994	2018 PP_{27}	—	July 28, 2012	Haleakala	Pan-STARRS 1	·	2.5 km	MPC · JPL
772995	2018 PX_{35}	—	August 11, 2018	Haleakala	Pan-STARRS 1	·	1.8 km	MPC · JPL
772996	2018 PE_{40}	—	March 2, 2011	Kitt Peak	Spacewatch	·	1.8 km	MPC · JPL
772997	2018 PO_{43}	—	August 6, 2018	Haleakala	Pan-STARRS 1	·	1.3 km	MPC · JPL
772998	2018 PG_{44}	—	August 14, 2018	Haleakala	Pan-STARRS 1	EOS	1.3 km	MPC · JPL
772999	2018 PD_{45}	—	August 11, 2018	Haleakala	Pan-STARRS 1	EOS	1.3 km	MPC · JPL
773000	2018 PJ_{45}	—	August 13, 2018	Haleakala	Pan-STARRS 1	·	1.6 km	MPC · JPL

back to top
