= List of minor planets: 796001–797000 =

The following is a partial list of minor planets, running from minor-planet number 796001 through 797000, inclusive. The primary data for this and other partial lists is based on JPL's "Small-Body Orbital Elements" and data available from the Minor Planet Center. Critical list information is also provided by the MPC, unless otherwise specified from Lowell Observatory. A detailed description of the table's columns and additional sources are given on the main page including a complete list of every page in this series, and a statistical break-up on the dynamical classification of minor planets.

Also see the summary list of all named bodies in numerical and alphabetical order, and the corresponding naming citations for the number range of this particular list. New namings may only be added to this list after official publication, as the preannouncement of names is condemned by the Working Group for Small Bodies Nomenclature of the International Astronomical Union.

Near-Earth obj.	MBA (inner)	MBA (outer)	Centaur
Mars-crosser	MBA (middle)	Jupiter trojan	Trans-Neptunian obj.
Unclassified

== 796001–796100 ==
Designation			Discovery			Properties		Ref
Permanent	Provisional	Named after	Date	Site	Discoverer(s)	Category	Diam.	Ref
796001	2008 YU_{85}	—	December 29, 2008	Kitt Peak	Spacewatch	·	1.2 km	MPC · JPL
796002	2008 YO_{96}	—	December 29, 2008	Mount Lemmon	Mount Lemmon Survey	·	1.0 km	MPC · JPL
796003	2008 YF_{105}	—	December 29, 2008	Kitt Peak	Spacewatch	EOS	1.2 km	MPC · JPL
796004	2008 YG_{121}	—	December 30, 2008	Kitt Peak	Spacewatch	·	1.8 km	MPC · JPL
796005	2008 YX_{121}	—	December 30, 2008	Kitt Peak	Spacewatch	EOS	1.3 km	MPC · JPL
796006	2008 YZ_{128}	—	December 31, 2008	Kitt Peak	Spacewatch	·	1.1 km	MPC · JPL
796007	2008 YP_{161}	—	December 21, 2008	Mount Lemmon	Mount Lemmon Survey	·	1.2 km	MPC · JPL
796008	2008 YB_{177}	—	December 22, 2008	Kitt Peak	Spacewatch	·	500 m	MPC · JPL
796009	2008 YP_{177}	—	December 22, 2008	Kitt Peak	Spacewatch	KOR	1.1 km	MPC · JPL
796010	2008 YX_{181}	—	August 9, 2015	Haleakala	Pan-STARRS 2	PHO	840 m	MPC · JPL
796011	2008 YR_{186}	—	February 20, 2014	Haleakala	Pan-STARRS 1	AEO	810 m	MPC · JPL
796012	2008 YD_{188}	—	December 21, 2008	Mount Lemmon	Mount Lemmon Survey	·	1.4 km	MPC · JPL
796013	2008 YW_{190}	—	December 31, 2008	Kitt Peak	Spacewatch	·	1.2 km	MPC · JPL
796014	2008 YE_{193}	—	December 21, 2008	Mount Lemmon	Mount Lemmon Survey	·	1.0 km	MPC · JPL
796015	2008 YS_{195}	—	December 31, 2008	Mount Lemmon	Mount Lemmon Survey	HNS	810 m	MPC · JPL
796016	2008 YM_{198}	—	December 31, 2008	Mount Lemmon	Mount Lemmon Survey	·	1.0 km	MPC · JPL
796017	2009 AN_{7}	—	January 1, 2009	Mount Lemmon	Mount Lemmon Survey	·	2.2 km	MPC · JPL
796018	2009 AD_{9}	—	December 29, 2008	Kitt Peak	Spacewatch	·	1.4 km	MPC · JPL
796019	2009 AX_{45}	—	January 2, 2009	Kitt Peak	Spacewatch	·	1.8 km	MPC · JPL
796020	2009 AY_{51}	—	January 1, 2009	Mount Lemmon	Mount Lemmon Survey	·	1.3 km	MPC · JPL
796021	2009 AA_{55}	—	January 1, 2009	Kitt Peak	Spacewatch	·	1.1 km	MPC · JPL
796022	2009 AJ_{56}	—	December 30, 2013	Kitt Peak	Spacewatch	·	1.3 km	MPC · JPL
796023	2009 AZ_{57}	—	December 11, 2012	Mount Lemmon	Mount Lemmon Survey	V	540 m	MPC · JPL
796024	2009 AA_{58}	—	December 22, 2008	Mount Lemmon	Mount Lemmon Survey	·	2.1 km	MPC · JPL
796025	2009 AH_{61}	—	January 7, 2009	Kitt Peak	Spacewatch	·	1.4 km	MPC · JPL
796026	2009 AF_{63}	—	January 1, 2009	Mount Lemmon	Mount Lemmon Survey	(5)	730 m	MPC · JPL
796027	2009 AK_{65}	—	January 2, 2009	Kitt Peak	Spacewatch	·	1.1 km	MPC · JPL
796028	2009 AW_{65}	—	January 2, 2009	Kitt Peak	Spacewatch	NAE	1.8 km	MPC · JPL
796029	2009 AD_{66}	—	January 2, 2009	Mount Lemmon	Mount Lemmon Survey	·	2.3 km	MPC · JPL
796030	2009 BP_{14}	—	November 20, 2008	Catalina	CSS	·	2.4 km	MPC · JPL
796031	2009 BX_{17}	—	January 16, 2009	Kitt Peak	Spacewatch	HOF	1.8 km	MPC · JPL
796032	2009 BB_{31}	—	January 16, 2009	Kitt Peak	Spacewatch	·	2.1 km	MPC · JPL
796033	2009 BD_{32}	—	November 23, 2008	Mount Lemmon	Mount Lemmon Survey	·	1.5 km	MPC · JPL
796034	2009 BM_{44}	—	January 16, 2009	Kitt Peak	Spacewatch	·	1.6 km	MPC · JPL
796035	2009 BH_{48}	—	January 16, 2009	Mount Lemmon	Mount Lemmon Survey	·	2.7 km	MPC · JPL
796036	2009 BF_{55}	—	January 16, 2009	Mount Lemmon	Mount Lemmon Survey	·	2.3 km	MPC · JPL
796037	2009 BY_{60}	—	December 29, 2008	Catalina	CSS	H	460 m	MPC · JPL
796038	2009 BZ_{68}	—	January 25, 2009	Kitt Peak	Spacewatch	·	1.2 km	MPC · JPL
796039	2009 BM_{89}	—	January 18, 2009	Kitt Peak	Spacewatch	H	380 m	MPC · JPL
796040	2009 BP_{92}	—	January 25, 2009	Kitt Peak	Spacewatch	·	1.1 km	MPC · JPL
796041	2009 BM_{109}	—	March 9, 2005	Kitt Peak	Spacewatch	·	790 m	MPC · JPL
796042	2009 BO_{125}	—	January 20, 2009	Mount Lemmon	Mount Lemmon Survey	·	2.0 km	MPC · JPL
796043	2009 BQ_{136}	—	October 14, 2007	Mount Lemmon	Mount Lemmon Survey	·	1.4 km	MPC · JPL
796044	2009 BJ_{154}	—	January 31, 2009	Kitt Peak	Spacewatch	H	340 m	MPC · JPL
796045	2009 BG_{171}	—	January 17, 2009	Kitt Peak	Spacewatch	·	1.4 km	MPC · JPL
796046	2009 BV_{177}	—	January 31, 2009	Mount Lemmon	Mount Lemmon Survey	·	1.5 km	MPC · JPL
796047	2009 BL_{180}	—	January 25, 2009	Kitt Peak	Spacewatch	·	1.1 km	MPC · JPL
796048	2009 BY_{195}	—	January 25, 2009	Kitt Peak	Spacewatch	EOS	1.3 km	MPC · JPL
796049	2009 BR_{196}	—	March 12, 2014	Mount Lemmon	Mount Lemmon Survey	·	1.4 km	MPC · JPL
796050	2009 BN_{199}	—	January 17, 2009	Kitt Peak	Spacewatch	V	560 m	MPC · JPL
796051	2009 BV_{200}	—	January 20, 2009	Mount Lemmon	Mount Lemmon Survey	·	1.1 km	MPC · JPL
796052	2009 BA_{201}	—	June 6, 2018	Haleakala	Pan-STARRS 1	PHO	1.2 km	MPC · JPL
796053	2009 BU_{201}	—	June 27, 2015	Haleakala	Pan-STARRS 1	·	940 m	MPC · JPL
796054	2009 BP_{202}	—	August 26, 2012	Haleakala	Pan-STARRS 1	·	1.2 km	MPC · JPL
796055	2009 BL_{204}	—	July 14, 2016	Haleakala	Pan-STARRS 1	KOR	990 m	MPC · JPL
796056	2009 BT_{204}	—	January 18, 2009	Kitt Peak	Spacewatch	·	1.5 km	MPC · JPL
796057	2009 BF_{206}	—	January 20, 2009	Mount Lemmon	Mount Lemmon Survey	(5)	650 m	MPC · JPL
796058	2009 BM_{206}	—	January 25, 2009	Kitt Peak	Spacewatch	·	1.2 km	MPC · JPL
796059	2009 BW_{206}	—	January 17, 2009	Mount Lemmon	Mount Lemmon Survey	·	1.2 km	MPC · JPL
796060	2009 BL_{208}	—	January 30, 2009	Mount Lemmon	Mount Lemmon Survey	EOS	1.4 km	MPC · JPL
796061	2009 BS_{208}	—	January 25, 2009	Kitt Peak	Spacewatch	·	1.1 km	MPC · JPL
796062	2009 BE_{211}	—	January 31, 2009	Kitt Peak	Spacewatch	·	970 m	MPC · JPL
796063	2009 BQ_{211}	—	January 18, 2009	Kitt Peak	Spacewatch	·	2.0 km	MPC · JPL
796064	2009 BW_{212}	—	January 25, 2009	Kitt Peak	Spacewatch	·	2.1 km	MPC · JPL
796065	2009 BF_{214}	—	February 10, 2014	Mount Lemmon	Mount Lemmon Survey	·	1.1 km	MPC · JPL
796066	2009 BC_{217}	—	January 29, 2009	Mount Lemmon	Mount Lemmon Survey	·	1.4 km	MPC · JPL
796067	2009 BT_{218}	—	January 17, 2009	Kitt Peak	Spacewatch	·	1.1 km	MPC · JPL
796068	2009 CT_{5}	—	February 14, 2009	Črni Vrh	Skvarč, J.	APO	680 m	MPC · JPL
796069	2009 CO_{8}	—	January 18, 2009	Kitt Peak	Spacewatch	H	430 m	MPC · JPL
796070	2009 CG_{18}	—	January 20, 2009	Mount Lemmon	Mount Lemmon Survey	·	990 m	MPC · JPL
796071	2009 CQ_{29}	—	February 1, 2009	Kitt Peak	Spacewatch	EOS	1.3 km	MPC · JPL
796072	2009 CQ_{43}	—	February 14, 2009	Kitt Peak	Spacewatch	·	2.0 km	MPC · JPL
796073	2009 CL_{74}	—	February 5, 2009	Kitt Peak	Spacewatch	·	1.9 km	MPC · JPL
796074	2009 CM_{74}	—	October 6, 2018	Mount Lemmon	Mount Lemmon Survey	·	2.0 km	MPC · JPL
796075	2009 CN_{74}	—	February 5, 2009	Kitt Peak	Spacewatch	·	1.9 km	MPC · JPL
796076	2009 CU_{75}	—	February 3, 2009	Mount Lemmon	Mount Lemmon Survey	·	1.7 km	MPC · JPL
796077	2009 CB_{76}	—	February 5, 2009	Kitt Peak	Spacewatch	·	1.2 km	MPC · JPL
796078	2009 CB_{77}	—	February 2, 2009	Kitt Peak	Spacewatch	·	1.6 km	MPC · JPL
796079	2009 CN_{78}	—	February 3, 2009	Mount Lemmon	Mount Lemmon Survey	·	2.3 km	MPC · JPL
796080	2009 CX_{78}	—	February 1, 2009	Kitt Peak	Spacewatch	·	1.5 km	MPC · JPL
796081	2009 DO	—	February 4, 2009	Mount Lemmon	Mount Lemmon Survey	H	440 m	MPC · JPL
796082	2009 DO_{2}	—	February 16, 2009	Dauban	C. Rinner, Kugel, F.	·	1.2 km	MPC · JPL
796083	2009 DS_{20}	—	February 3, 2009	Kitt Peak	Spacewatch	·	1.1 km	MPC · JPL
796084	2009 DB_{24}	—	February 21, 2009	Kitt Peak	Spacewatch	EOS	1.2 km	MPC · JPL
796085	2009 DO_{27}	—	February 22, 2009	Calar Alto	F. Hormuth	·	1.2 km	MPC · JPL
796086	2009 DO_{33}	—	February 20, 2009	Kitt Peak	Spacewatch	·	1.7 km	MPC · JPL
796087	2009 DU_{52}	—	February 1, 2009	Kitt Peak	Spacewatch	·	1.3 km	MPC · JPL
796088	2009 DG_{54}	—	February 22, 2009	Kitt Peak	Spacewatch	·	1.6 km	MPC · JPL
796089	2009 DA_{62}	—	February 22, 2009	Kitt Peak	Spacewatch	EOS	1.3 km	MPC · JPL
796090	2009 DU_{62}	—	February 22, 2009	Kitt Peak	Spacewatch	·	1.5 km	MPC · JPL
796091	2009 DL_{85}	—	February 27, 2009	Kitt Peak	Spacewatch	EOS	1.3 km	MPC · JPL
796092	2009 DC_{90}	—	February 26, 2009	Kitt Peak	Spacewatch	H	330 m	MPC · JPL
796093	2009 DC_{92}	—	January 3, 2009	Mount Lemmon	Mount Lemmon Survey	·	1.3 km	MPC · JPL
796094	2009 DJ_{93}	—	February 28, 2009	Mount Lemmon	Mount Lemmon Survey	·	1.2 km	MPC · JPL
796095	2009 DE_{118}	—	February 27, 2009	Kitt Peak	Spacewatch	·	1.6 km	MPC · JPL
796096	2009 DT_{129}	—	February 27, 2009	Kitt Peak	Spacewatch	·	1.5 km	MPC · JPL
796097	2009 DQ_{140}	—	February 26, 2009	Kitt Peak	Spacewatch	·	1.6 km	MPC · JPL
796098	2009 DW_{149}	—	March 21, 2015	Haleakala	Pan-STARRS 1	HYG	2.0 km	MPC · JPL
796099	2009 DP_{150}	—	February 20, 2009	Mount Lemmon	Mount Lemmon Survey	·	1.4 km	MPC · JPL
796100	2009 DO_{151}	—	February 28, 2009	Mount Lemmon	Mount Lemmon Survey	AGN	900 m	MPC · JPL

== 796101–796200 ==
back to top

Designation			Discovery			Properties		Ref
Permanent	Provisional	Named after	Date	Site	Discoverer(s)	Category	Diam.	Ref
796101	2009 DE_{152}	—	February 20, 2009	Mount Lemmon	Mount Lemmon Survey	ADE	1.4 km	MPC · JPL
796102	2009 DC_{153}	—	February 28, 2009	Kitt Peak	Spacewatch	·	2.2 km	MPC · JPL
796103	2009 DU_{154}	—	February 20, 2009	Kitt Peak	Spacewatch	·	1.3 km	MPC · JPL
796104	2009 DZ_{154}	—	February 20, 2009	Kitt Peak	Spacewatch	3:2	3.5 km	MPC · JPL
796105	2009 DG_{155}	—	February 19, 2009	Kitt Peak	Spacewatch	·	1.0 km	MPC · JPL
796106	2009 DJ_{155}	—	February 20, 2009	Kitt Peak	Spacewatch	AEG	1.6 km	MPC · JPL
796107	2009 DS_{155}	—	February 19, 2009	Kitt Peak	Spacewatch	EOS	1.2 km	MPC · JPL
796108	2009 DY_{156}	—	February 20, 2009	Kitt Peak	Spacewatch	·	1.3 km	MPC · JPL
796109	2009 DY_{158}	—	February 28, 2009	Kitt Peak	Spacewatch	EUN	900 m	MPC · JPL
796110	2009 DV_{160}	—	February 28, 2009	Kitt Peak	Spacewatch	·	1.1 km	MPC · JPL
796111	2009 DW_{160}	—	February 20, 2009	Mount Lemmon	Mount Lemmon Survey	·	2.2 km	MPC · JPL
796112	2009 DN_{161}	—	May 20, 2015	Cerro Tololo	DECam	·	1.4 km	MPC · JPL
796113	2009 DV_{161}	—	February 27, 2009	Mount Lemmon	Mount Lemmon Survey	ADE	1.4 km	MPC · JPL
796114	2009 DK_{162}	—	February 20, 2009	Kitt Peak	Spacewatch	·	1.9 km	MPC · JPL
796115	2009 DM_{162}	—	January 3, 2019	Haleakala	Pan-STARRS 1	·	1.7 km	MPC · JPL
796116	2009 DP_{162}	—	October 23, 2017	Mount Lemmon	Mount Lemmon Survey	EOS	1.3 km	MPC · JPL
796117	2009 DD_{163}	—	October 10, 2007	Kitt Peak	Spacewatch	·	1.2 km	MPC · JPL
796118	2009 DL_{165}	—	February 20, 2009	Mount Lemmon	Mount Lemmon Survey	·	1.4 km	MPC · JPL
796119	2009 DM_{165}	—	January 24, 2014	Haleakala	Pan-STARRS 1	·	1.9 km	MPC · JPL
796120	2009 EM_{1}	—	March 3, 2009	Catalina	CSS	AMO	90 m	MPC · JPL
796121	2009 EY_{4}	—	May 20, 2015	Cerro Tololo	DECam	·	1.3 km	MPC · JPL
796122	2009 EY_{10}	—	March 2, 2009	Kitt Peak	Spacewatch	·	2.1 km	MPC · JPL
796123	2009 EQ_{17}	—	November 21, 2008	Mount Lemmon	Mount Lemmon Survey	·	650 m	MPC · JPL
796124	2009 EB_{32}	—	March 3, 2009	Kitt Peak	Spacewatch	3:2 · SHU	3.9 km	MPC · JPL
796125	2009 EC_{33}	—	August 31, 2017	Haleakala	Pan-STARRS 1	·	1.6 km	MPC · JPL
796126	2009 EJ_{36}	—	June 28, 2014	Haleakala	Pan-STARRS 1	(5)	910 m	MPC · JPL
796127	2009 EO_{37}	—	February 12, 2018	Haleakala	Pan-STARRS 1	·	1.3 km	MPC · JPL
796128	2009 EE_{41}	—	March 3, 2009	Kitt Peak	Spacewatch	·	2.1 km	MPC · JPL
796129	2009 EZ_{41}	—	March 3, 2009	Mount Lemmon	Mount Lemmon Survey	·	1.2 km	MPC · JPL
796130	2009 FF_{6}	—	February 22, 2009	Kitt Peak	Spacewatch	KOR	1.1 km	MPC · JPL
796131	2009 FA_{13}	—	March 18, 2009	Mount Lemmon	Mount Lemmon Survey	·	1.4 km	MPC · JPL
796132	2009 FR_{30}	—	March 26, 2009	Kitt Peak	Spacewatch	AMO	270 m	MPC · JPL
796133	2009 FC_{47}	—	July 30, 2017	Haleakala	Pan-STARRS 1	·	510 m	MPC · JPL
796134	2009 FY_{51}	—	April 2, 2005	Kitt Peak	Spacewatch	·	820 m	MPC · JPL
796135	2009 FJ_{53}	—	March 29, 2009	Kitt Peak	Spacewatch	·	2.0 km	MPC · JPL
796136	2009 FW_{58}	—	March 3, 2009	Kitt Peak	Spacewatch	·	1.5 km	MPC · JPL
796137	2009 FX_{60}	—	March 21, 2009	Mount Lemmon	Mount Lemmon Survey	·	740 m	MPC · JPL
796138	2009 FM_{61}	—	March 26, 2009	Kitt Peak	Spacewatch	·	1.4 km	MPC · JPL
796139	2009 FH_{62}	—	March 21, 2009	Mount Lemmon	Mount Lemmon Survey	·	1.2 km	MPC · JPL
796140	2009 FD_{76}	—	March 24, 2009	Kitt Peak	Spacewatch	·	1.6 km	MPC · JPL
796141	2009 FH_{77}	—	March 19, 2009	Mount Lemmon	Mount Lemmon Survey	·	820 m	MPC · JPL
796142	2009 FZ_{79}	—	March 29, 2009	Mount Lemmon	Mount Lemmon Survey	·	2.0 km	MPC · JPL
796143	2009 FA_{84}	—	January 26, 2012	Mount Lemmon	Mount Lemmon Survey	·	470 m	MPC · JPL
796144	2009 FG_{88}	—	March 18, 2009	Kitt Peak	Spacewatch	·	1.9 km	MPC · JPL
796145	2009 FP_{88}	—	October 28, 2017	Haleakala	Pan-STARRS 1	·	1.6 km	MPC · JPL
796146	2009 FD_{89}	—	March 18, 2009	Mount Lemmon	Mount Lemmon Survey	·	1.6 km	MPC · JPL
796147	2009 FO_{91}	—	March 16, 2009	Kitt Peak	Spacewatch	·	1.3 km	MPC · JPL
796148	2009 FS_{91}	—	March 21, 2009	Mount Lemmon	Mount Lemmon Survey	·	720 m	MPC · JPL
796149	2009 FD_{92}	—	March 21, 2009	Mount Lemmon	Mount Lemmon Survey	AEO	900 m	MPC · JPL
796150	2009 FH_{92}	—	March 21, 2009	Mount Lemmon	Mount Lemmon Survey	·	1.1 km	MPC · JPL
796151	2009 FL_{92}	—	March 16, 2009	Kitt Peak	Spacewatch	·	1.6 km	MPC · JPL
796152	2009 FN_{92}	—	March 19, 2009	Mount Lemmon	Mount Lemmon Survey	·	1.5 km	MPC · JPL
796153	2009 FC_{93}	—	March 25, 2009	Anderson Mesa	Wasserman, L. H.	·	1.2 km	MPC · JPL
796154	2009 FF_{94}	—	March 19, 2009	Kitt Peak	Spacewatch	·	890 m	MPC · JPL
796155	2009 FJ_{94}	—	March 31, 2009	Mount Lemmon	Mount Lemmon Survey	·	1.1 km	MPC · JPL
796156	2009 FV_{97}	—	December 6, 2012	Mount Lemmon	Mount Lemmon Survey	EOS	1.2 km	MPC · JPL
796157	2009 GB_{2}	—	March 18, 2009	Kitt Peak	Spacewatch	·	1.0 km	MPC · JPL
796158	2009 GO_{8}	—	July 30, 2013	Kitt Peak	Spacewatch	·	560 m	MPC · JPL
796159	2009 GK_{9}	—	April 2, 2009	Kitt Peak	Spacewatch	·	1.7 km	MPC · JPL
796160	2009 HJ_{9}	—	April 17, 2009	Mount Lemmon	Mount Lemmon Survey	EOS	1.2 km	MPC · JPL
796161	2009 HS_{14}	—	March 24, 2009	Mount Lemmon	Mount Lemmon Survey	·	1.3 km	MPC · JPL
796162	2009 HV_{15}	—	April 18, 2009	Kitt Peak	Spacewatch	·	1.8 km	MPC · JPL
796163	2009 HY_{27}	—	April 18, 2009	Kitt Peak	Spacewatch	·	920 m	MPC · JPL
796164	2009 HU_{29}	—	April 19, 2009	Kitt Peak	Spacewatch	·	820 m	MPC · JPL
796165	2009 HY_{29}	—	March 29, 2009	Mount Lemmon	Mount Lemmon Survey	·	1.4 km	MPC · JPL
796166	2009 HS_{32}	—	April 19, 2009	Kitt Peak	Spacewatch	·	1 km	MPC · JPL
796167	2009 HW_{33}	—	April 19, 2009	Mount Lemmon	Mount Lemmon Survey	·	1.4 km	MPC · JPL
796168	2009 HA_{55}	—	April 20, 2009	Kitt Peak	Spacewatch	·	810 m	MPC · JPL
796169	2009 HL_{63}	—	April 22, 2009	Mount Lemmon	Mount Lemmon Survey	KOR	950 m	MPC · JPL
796170	2009 HV_{65}	—	April 23, 2009	Mount Lemmon	Mount Lemmon Survey	·	1.0 km	MPC · JPL
796171	2009 HA_{70}	—	April 22, 2009	Mount Lemmon	Mount Lemmon Survey	THM	1.9 km	MPC · JPL
796172	2009 HT_{97}	—	April 18, 2009	Kitt Peak	Spacewatch	·	1.7 km	MPC · JPL
796173	2009 HJ_{98}	—	April 21, 2009	Mount Lemmon	Mount Lemmon Survey	H	380 m	MPC · JPL
796174	2009 HX_{98}	—	April 17, 2009	Mount Lemmon	Mount Lemmon Survey	·	1.8 km	MPC · JPL
796175	2009 HD_{114}	—	April 20, 2009	Kitt Peak	Spacewatch	·	840 m	MPC · JPL
796176	2009 HN_{114}	—	May 21, 2015	Haleakala	Pan-STARRS 1	EOS	1.4 km	MPC · JPL
796177	2009 HM_{115}	—	March 16, 2013	Mount Lemmon	Mount Lemmon Survey	·	780 m	MPC · JPL
796178	2009 HG_{120}	—	April 10, 2013	Haleakala	Pan-STARRS 1	·	750 m	MPC · JPL
796179	2009 HT_{120}	—	March 15, 2013	Kitt Peak	Spacewatch	EUN	730 m	MPC · JPL
796180	2009 HA_{121}	—	April 24, 2009	Mount Lemmon	Mount Lemmon Survey	·	2.1 km	MPC · JPL
796181	2009 HT_{121}	—	April 18, 2009	Kitt Peak	Spacewatch	·	1.5 km	MPC · JPL
796182	2009 HR_{122}	—	April 20, 2009	Mount Lemmon	Mount Lemmon Survey	·	1.5 km	MPC · JPL
796183	2009 HZ_{122}	—	April 22, 2009	Mount Lemmon	Mount Lemmon Survey	·	1.9 km	MPC · JPL
796184	2009 HR_{123}	—	April 22, 2009	Mount Lemmon	Mount Lemmon Survey	·	1.9 km	MPC · JPL
796185	2009 HK_{125}	—	April 27, 2009	Kitt Peak	Spacewatch	·	1 km	MPC · JPL
796186	2009 HQ_{126}	—	April 27, 2009	Mount Lemmon	Mount Lemmon Survey	EOS	1.5 km	MPC · JPL
796187	2009 HW_{126}	—	April 21, 2009	Mount Lemmon	Mount Lemmon Survey	·	1.6 km	MPC · JPL
796188	2009 HD_{129}	—	February 10, 2014	Mount Lemmon	Mount Lemmon Survey	·	1.4 km	MPC · JPL
796189	2009 HT_{129}	—	April 17, 2009	Mauna Kea	P. A. Wiegert	·	1.6 km	MPC · JPL
796190	2009 HX_{129}	—	April 20, 2009	Mount Lemmon	Mount Lemmon Survey	3:2 · SHU	4.0 km	MPC · JPL
796191	2009 JO_{6}	—	May 13, 2009	Kitt Peak	Spacewatch	·	780 m	MPC · JPL
796192	2009 JW_{9}	—	May 14, 2009	Kitt Peak	Spacewatch	·	1.8 km	MPC · JPL
796193	2009 JR_{11}	—	May 15, 2009	Kitt Peak	Spacewatch	·	830 m	MPC · JPL
796194	2009 JS_{13}	—	May 1, 2009	Cerro Burek	I. de la Cueva	EUN	1.0 km	MPC · JPL
796195	2009 JA_{15}	—	May 1, 2009	Cerro Burek	I. de la Cueva	EUN	720 m	MPC · JPL
796196	2009 JF_{20}	—	April 22, 2009	Kitt Peak	Spacewatch	·	2.0 km	MPC · JPL
796197	2009 JU_{20}	—	May 1, 2009	Mount Lemmon	Mount Lemmon Survey	·	1.0 km	MPC · JPL
796198	2009 JD_{22}	—	May 15, 2009	Kitt Peak	Spacewatch	TIR	1.7 km	MPC · JPL
796199	2009 JK_{22}	—	May 15, 2009	Kitt Peak	Spacewatch	·	2.6 km	MPC · JPL
796200	2009 JP_{22}	—	May 1, 2009	Mount Lemmon	Mount Lemmon Survey	·	1.7 km	MPC · JPL

== 796201–796300 ==
back to top

Designation			Discovery			Properties		Ref
Permanent	Provisional	Named after	Date	Site	Discoverer(s)	Category	Diam.	Ref
796201	2009 JE_{24}	—	May 13, 2009	Kitt Peak	Spacewatch	(13314)	1.5 km	MPC · JPL
796202	2009 JM_{24}	—	May 4, 2009	Mount Lemmon	Mount Lemmon Survey	·	2.1 km	MPC · JPL
796203	2009 KN_{3}	—	April 29, 2009	Kitt Peak	Spacewatch	·	2.2 km	MPC · JPL
796204	2009 KK_{6}	—	March 31, 2009	Mount Lemmon	Mount Lemmon Survey	·	2.1 km	MPC · JPL
796205	2009 KO_{16}	—	May 1, 2009	Kitt Peak	Spacewatch	·	770 m	MPC · JPL
796206	2009 KO_{21}	—	May 29, 2009	Mount Lemmon	Mount Lemmon Survey	·	2.5 km	MPC · JPL
796207	2009 KJ_{29}	—	July 3, 2005	Palomar Mountain	NEAT	·	1.4 km	MPC · JPL
796208	2009 KY_{40}	—	April 16, 2018	Haleakala	Pan-STARRS 1	·	1.4 km	MPC · JPL
796209	2009 KB_{42}	—	May 25, 2015	Haleakala	Pan-STARRS 1	·	2.0 km	MPC · JPL
796210	2009 KG_{43}	—	May 18, 2009	Mount Lemmon	Mount Lemmon Survey	·	1.3 km	MPC · JPL
796211	2009 LL_{7}	—	November 3, 2010	Mount Lemmon	Mount Lemmon Survey	PHO	940 m	MPC · JPL
796212	2009 LJ_{8}	—	June 15, 2009	Mount Lemmon	Mount Lemmon Survey	·	870 m	MPC · JPL
796213	2009 MZ_{3}	—	June 19, 2009	Kitt Peak	Spacewatch	·	1.2 km	MPC · JPL
796214	2009 MJ_{11}	—	April 18, 2013	Mount Lemmon	Mount Lemmon Survey	EUN	740 m	MPC · JPL
796215	2009 MQ_{11}	—	April 9, 2014	Haleakala	Pan-STARRS 1	H	510 m	MPC · JPL
796216	2009 ME_{12}	—	June 20, 2015	Haleakala	Pan-STARRS 1	·	2.3 km	MPC · JPL
796217	2009 NM_{2}	—	July 13, 2009	Palomar Mountain	Palomar Transient Factory	·	990 m	MPC · JPL
796218	2009 OL_{1}	—	July 18, 2009	Sandlot	G. Hug	ERI	1.2 km	MPC · JPL
796219	2009 OS_{2}	—	July 18, 2009	Cerro Burek	I. de la Cueva	·	2.4 km	MPC · JPL
796220	2009 OA_{4}	—	June 24, 2009	Kitt Peak	Spacewatch	·	2.0 km	MPC · JPL
796221	2009 OY_{8}	—	June 16, 2009	Mount Lemmon	Mount Lemmon Survey	·	1.5 km	MPC · JPL
796222	2009 OR_{26}	—	February 23, 2015	Haleakala	Pan-STARRS 1	·	650 m	MPC · JPL
796223	2009 PF_{1}	—	August 13, 2009	Dauban	C. Rinner, Kugel, F.	(5)	930 m	MPC · JPL
796224	2009 PT_{13}	—	October 1, 2005	Catalina	CSS	·	1.0 km	MPC · JPL
796225	2009 PH_{22}	—	August 1, 2009	Siding Spring	SSS	·	1.2 km	MPC · JPL
796226	2009 PL_{23}	—	August 15, 2009	Kitt Peak	Spacewatch	·	1.1 km	MPC · JPL
796227	2009 QB_{10}	—	August 21, 2009	Dauban	C. Rinner, Kugel, F.	·	980 m	MPC · JPL
796228	2009 QG_{12}	—	August 16, 2009	Kitt Peak	Spacewatch	·	1.2 km	MPC · JPL
796229	2009 QY_{23}	—	August 16, 2009	Catalina	CSS	·	570 m	MPC · JPL
796230	2009 QT_{28}	—	June 15, 2009	Mount Lemmon	Mount Lemmon Survey	·	480 m	MPC · JPL
796231	2009 QV_{28}	—	August 18, 2009	Catalina	CSS	PHO	900 m	MPC · JPL
796232	2009 QD_{32}	—	August 15, 2009	Kitt Peak	Spacewatch	·	1.4 km	MPC · JPL
796233	2009 QT_{32}	—	August 25, 2009	Sierra Stars	R. Matson	·	1.2 km	MPC · JPL
796234	2009 QO_{34}	—	August 27, 2009	Puebla de Don Fadrique	OAM	·	1.4 km	MPC · JPL
796235	2009 QE_{39}	—	August 20, 2009	Kitt Peak	Spacewatch	EOS	1.3 km	MPC · JPL
796236	2009 QP_{39}	—	August 20, 2009	Kitt Peak	Spacewatch	·	2.3 km	MPC · JPL
796237	2009 QE_{57}	—	August 20, 2009	Kitt Peak	Spacewatch	·	1.2 km	MPC · JPL
796238	2009 QG_{58}	—	August 16, 2009	Kitt Peak	Spacewatch	·	1.2 km	MPC · JPL
796239	2009 QH_{59}	—	August 30, 2009	Catalina	CSS	T_{j} (2.99) · EUP	2.8 km	MPC · JPL
796240	2009 QF_{63}	—	August 19, 2009	Catalina	CSS	H	650 m	MPC · JPL
796241	2009 QZ_{67}	—	August 19, 2009	Kitt Peak	Spacewatch	·	530 m	MPC · JPL
796242	2009 QA_{71}	—	April 11, 2015	Mount Lemmon	Mount Lemmon Survey	·	460 m	MPC · JPL
796243	2009 QC_{72}	—	August 28, 2009	Kitt Peak	Spacewatch	·	1.6 km	MPC · JPL
796244	2009 QG_{73}	—	August 27, 2009	Kitt Peak	Spacewatch	·	2.1 km	MPC · JPL
796245	2009 QS_{73}	—	August 17, 2009	Kitt Peak	Spacewatch	·	700 m	MPC · JPL
796246	2009 QP_{78}	—	August 18, 2009	Kitt Peak	Spacewatch	·	1.1 km	MPC · JPL
796247	2009 QO_{79}	—	August 28, 2009	Kitt Peak	Spacewatch	·	960 m	MPC · JPL
796248	2009 QY_{79}	—	August 18, 2009	Kitt Peak	Spacewatch	·	1.1 km	MPC · JPL
796249	2009 QV_{81}	—	August 28, 2009	Puebla de Don Fadrique	OAM	·	1.1 km	MPC · JPL
796250	2009 QY_{81}	—	August 27, 2009	Kitt Peak	Spacewatch	·	930 m	MPC · JPL
796251	2009 RB_{5}	—	August 27, 2009	Kitt Peak	Spacewatch	·	1.0 km	MPC · JPL
796252	2009 RF_{9}	—	September 12, 2009	Kitt Peak	Spacewatch	BRG	990 m	MPC · JPL
796253	2009 RE_{11}	—	September 12, 2009	Kitt Peak	Spacewatch	V	500 m	MPC · JPL
796254	2009 RU_{14}	—	September 12, 2009	Kitt Peak	Spacewatch	·	860 m	MPC · JPL
796255	2009 RX_{20}	—	October 1, 2000	Kitt Peak	Spacewatch	·	1.4 km	MPC · JPL
796256	2009 RX_{30}	—	September 14, 2009	Kitt Peak	Spacewatch	·	1.2 km	MPC · JPL
796257	2009 RP_{49}	—	September 15, 2009	Kitt Peak	Spacewatch	·	730 m	MPC · JPL
796258	2009 RX_{51}	—	September 15, 2009	Kitt Peak	Spacewatch	·	1.8 km	MPC · JPL
796259	2009 RR_{65}	—	September 12, 2009	ESA OGS	ESA OGS	·	2.2 km	MPC · JPL
796260	2009 RK_{66}	—	October 1, 2005	Kitt Peak	Spacewatch	·	1.1 km	MPC · JPL
796261	2009 RH_{68}	—	September 15, 2009	Kitt Peak	Spacewatch	·	1.2 km	MPC · JPL
796262	2009 RO_{77}	—	September 15, 2009	Kitt Peak	Spacewatch	·	570 m	MPC · JPL
796263	2009 RJ_{80}	—	September 15, 2009	Mount Lemmon	Mount Lemmon Survey	·	1.2 km	MPC · JPL
796264	2009 RG_{82}	—	September 15, 2009	Kitt Peak	Spacewatch	EOS	1.2 km	MPC · JPL
796265	2009 SM_{14}	—	September 18, 2009	Bisei	BATTeRS	MRX	830 m	MPC · JPL
796266	2009 SE_{21}	—	August 28, 2009	Catalina	CSS	·	1.4 km	MPC · JPL
796267	2009 SM_{25}	—	September 16, 2009	Kitt Peak	Spacewatch	·	1.4 km	MPC · JPL
796268	2009 SY_{28}	—	September 16, 2009	Kitt Peak	Spacewatch	·	1.9 km	MPC · JPL
796269	2009 SB_{30}	—	September 16, 2009	Kitt Peak	Spacewatch	KOR	1.0 km	MPC · JPL
796270	2009 SM_{35}	—	September 16, 2009	Kitt Peak	Spacewatch	H	410 m	MPC · JPL
796271	2009 SE_{51}	—	August 18, 2009	Kitt Peak	Spacewatch	EUN	880 m	MPC · JPL
796272	2009 SL_{54}	—	September 17, 2009	Mount Lemmon	Mount Lemmon Survey	EOS	1.2 km	MPC · JPL
796273	2009 SK_{55}	—	October 22, 2005	Kitt Peak	Spacewatch	·	860 m	MPC · JPL
796274	2009 SJ_{56}	—	September 17, 2009	Kitt Peak	Spacewatch	L4	5.9 km	MPC · JPL
796275	2009 SW_{67}	—	September 17, 2009	Kitt Peak	Spacewatch	·	1.3 km	MPC · JPL
796276	2009 SG_{68}	—	September 17, 2009	Mount Lemmon	Mount Lemmon Survey	·	1.3 km	MPC · JPL
796277	2009 SN_{72}	—	October 29, 2005	Kitt Peak	Spacewatch	·	1.1 km	MPC · JPL
796278	2009 SW_{74}	—	September 17, 2009	Kitt Peak	Spacewatch	·	1.2 km	MPC · JPL
796279	2009 SD_{76}	—	September 17, 2009	Kitt Peak	Spacewatch	·	1.1 km	MPC · JPL
796280	2009 SP_{82}	—	September 18, 2009	Mount Lemmon	Mount Lemmon Survey	EOS	1.4 km	MPC · JPL
796281	2009 SZ_{92}	—	September 16, 2004	Kitt Peak	Spacewatch	·	1.4 km	MPC · JPL
796282	2009 SH_{96}	—	September 19, 2009	Mount Lemmon	Mount Lemmon Survey	·	1.6 km	MPC · JPL
796283	2009 SC_{97}	—	September 20, 2009	Mount Lemmon	Mount Lemmon Survey	·	1.2 km	MPC · JPL
796284	2009 SP_{109}	—	September 17, 2009	Mount Lemmon	Mount Lemmon Survey	·	630 m	MPC · JPL
796285	2009 SX_{109}	—	August 18, 2009	Kitt Peak	Spacewatch	·	530 m	MPC · JPL
796286	2009 SL_{111}	—	September 18, 2009	Kitt Peak	Spacewatch	·	1.1 km	MPC · JPL
796287	2009 SH_{117}	—	September 18, 2009	Kitt Peak	Spacewatch	·	1.3 km	MPC · JPL
796288	2009 SM_{119}	—	September 18, 2009	Kitt Peak	Spacewatch	·	1.5 km	MPC · JPL
796289	2009 ST_{119}	—	September 18, 2009	Kitt Peak	Spacewatch	·	1.3 km	MPC · JPL
796290	2009 SP_{125}	—	September 18, 2009	Kitt Peak	Spacewatch	·	660 m	MPC · JPL
796291	2009 SW_{130}	—	September 18, 2009	Kitt Peak	Spacewatch	EOS	1.4 km	MPC · JPL
796292	2009 SD_{133}	—	November 21, 2005	Kitt Peak	Spacewatch	·	930 m	MPC · JPL
796293	2009 SC_{143}	—	September 19, 2009	Kitt Peak	Spacewatch	·	600 m	MPC · JPL
796294	2009 SM_{145}	—	September 19, 2009	Mount Lemmon	Mount Lemmon Survey	NEM	1.5 km	MPC · JPL
796295	2009 SR_{149}	—	September 20, 2009	Kitt Peak	Spacewatch	·	1.4 km	MPC · JPL
796296	2009 SL_{161}	—	September 21, 2009	Catalina	CSS	H	430 m	MPC · JPL
796297	2009 SO_{162}	—	November 1, 2005	Mount Lemmon	Mount Lemmon Survey	·	940 m	MPC · JPL
796298	2009 SC_{163}	—	September 21, 2009	Mount Lemmon	Mount Lemmon Survey	·	1.2 km	MPC · JPL
796299	2009 SJ_{169}	—	September 25, 2009	Catalina	CSS	·	1.3 km	MPC · JPL
796300	2009 SF_{174}	—	September 18, 2009	Mount Lemmon	Mount Lemmon Survey	·	450 m	MPC · JPL

== 796301–796400 ==
back to top

Designation			Discovery			Properties		Ref
Permanent	Provisional	Named after	Date	Site	Discoverer(s)	Category	Diam.	Ref
796301	2009 SH_{176}	—	September 19, 2009	Mount Lemmon	Mount Lemmon Survey	·	760 m	MPC · JPL
796302	2009 SJ_{180}	—	September 20, 2009	Mount Lemmon	Mount Lemmon Survey	·	1.3 km	MPC · JPL
796303	2009 SO_{181}	—	August 27, 2009	Kitt Peak	Spacewatch	·	1.2 km	MPC · JPL
796304	2009 SS_{186}	—	September 21, 2009	Kitt Peak	Spacewatch	·	1.2 km	MPC · JPL
796305	2009 SA_{192}	—	September 22, 2009	Kitt Peak	Spacewatch	·	670 m	MPC · JPL
796306	2009 SV_{219}	—	September 24, 2009	Mount Lemmon	Mount Lemmon Survey	·	820 m	MPC · JPL
796307	2009 SK_{220}	—	September 24, 2009	Mount Lemmon	Mount Lemmon Survey	H	320 m	MPC · JPL
796308	2009 SL_{220}	—	September 24, 2009	Mount Lemmon	Mount Lemmon Survey	·	1.1 km	MPC · JPL
796309	2009 SQ_{222}	—	September 16, 2009	Kitt Peak	Spacewatch	·	1.2 km	MPC · JPL
796310	2009 SF_{223}	—	September 25, 2009	Mount Lemmon	Mount Lemmon Survey	EOS	1.3 km	MPC · JPL
796311	2009 SB_{224}	—	September 15, 2009	Kitt Peak	Spacewatch	·	2.2 km	MPC · JPL
796312	2009 SF_{225}	—	September 19, 2009	Kitt Peak	Spacewatch	·	1.2 km	MPC · JPL
796313	2009 SO_{229}	—	March 26, 2008	Mount Lemmon	Mount Lemmon Survey	PHO	710 m	MPC · JPL
796314	2009 SF_{242}	—	September 21, 2009	Catalina	CSS	T_{j} (2.98)	2.6 km	MPC · JPL
796315	2009 SV_{257}	—	September 21, 2009	Mount Lemmon	Mount Lemmon Survey	·	1.0 km	MPC · JPL
796316	2009 SH_{260}	—	September 22, 2009	Mount Lemmon	Mount Lemmon Survey	·	1.3 km	MPC · JPL
796317	2009 SY_{269}	—	September 24, 2009	Kitt Peak	Spacewatch	·	2.2 km	MPC · JPL
796318	2009 SM_{273}	—	February 10, 2008	Kitt Peak	Spacewatch	·	1.1 km	MPC · JPL
796319	2009 SO_{276}	—	September 25, 2009	Kitt Peak	Spacewatch	·	620 m	MPC · JPL
796320	2009 SJ_{285}	—	September 25, 2009	Mount Lemmon	Mount Lemmon Survey	·	1.1 km	MPC · JPL
796321	2009 SW_{288}	—	August 15, 2009	Kitt Peak	Spacewatch	·	730 m	MPC · JPL
796322	2009 SJ_{304}	—	August 27, 2009	Kitt Peak	Spacewatch	·	790 m	MPC · JPL
796323	2009 SN_{310}	—	February 26, 2007	Kitt Peak	Spacewatch	·	1.4 km	MPC · JPL
796324	2009 SP_{315}	—	August 27, 2009	Kitt Peak	Spacewatch	THB	1.8 km	MPC · JPL
796325	2009 SC_{316}	—	September 19, 2009	Kitt Peak	Spacewatch	·	760 m	MPC · JPL
796326	2009 SB_{317}	—	September 19, 2009	Mount Lemmon	Mount Lemmon Survey	·	730 m	MPC · JPL
796327	2009 SL_{317}	—	September 19, 2009	Kitt Peak	Spacewatch	L4	6.0 km	MPC · JPL
796328	2009 SD_{332}	—	September 21, 2009	Catalina	CSS	·	1.7 km	MPC · JPL
796329	2009 SH_{347}	—	September 28, 2009	Mount Lemmon	Mount Lemmon Survey	·	930 m	MPC · JPL
796330	2009 SP_{355}	—	August 15, 2009	Kitt Peak	Spacewatch	·	600 m	MPC · JPL
796331	2009 SH_{359}	—	September 22, 2009	Kitt Peak	Spacewatch	·	1.2 km	MPC · JPL
796332	2009 SK_{364}	—	September 20, 2009	La Silla	A. Galád	·	1.1 km	MPC · JPL
796333	2009 SJ_{375}	—	February 8, 2007	Kitt Peak	Spacewatch	·	630 m	MPC · JPL
796334	2009 SS_{375}	—	March 13, 2012	Mount Lemmon	Mount Lemmon Survey	EOS	1.5 km	MPC · JPL
796335	2009 SV_{375}	—	October 25, 2013	Kitt Peak	Spacewatch	NYS	790 m	MPC · JPL
796336	2009 SQ_{377}	—	July 25, 2014	Haleakala	Pan-STARRS 1	·	1.9 km	MPC · JPL
796337	2009 SY_{377}	—	September 17, 2009	Kitt Peak	Spacewatch	V	470 m	MPC · JPL
796338	2009 SK_{379}	—	July 14, 2013	Haleakala	Pan-STARRS 1	·	1.1 km	MPC · JPL
796339	2009 SA_{380}	—	April 26, 2006	Cerro Tololo	Deep Ecliptic Survey	·	1.8 km	MPC · JPL
796340	2009 SH_{380}	—	February 19, 2012	Kitt Peak	Spacewatch	·	1.1 km	MPC · JPL
796341	2009 SF_{387}	—	August 27, 2014	Haleakala	Pan-STARRS 1	NAE	1.3 km	MPC · JPL
796342	2009 SL_{387}	—	March 7, 2016	Haleakala	Pan-STARRS 1	·	1.5 km	MPC · JPL
796343	2009 SN_{387}	—	September 24, 2009	Mount Lemmon	Mount Lemmon Survey	·	1.2 km	MPC · JPL
796344	2009 SZ_{387}	—	September 21, 2009	Mount Lemmon	Mount Lemmon Survey	·	1.2 km	MPC · JPL
796345	2009 SE_{389}	—	April 10, 2015	Mount Lemmon	Mount Lemmon Survey	·	450 m	MPC · JPL
796346	2009 SP_{390}	—	July 25, 2014	Haleakala	Pan-STARRS 1	EOS	1.1 km	MPC · JPL
796347	2009 SU_{390}	—	July 25, 2014	Haleakala	Pan-STARRS 1	·	1.2 km	MPC · JPL
796348	2009 ST_{391}	—	March 10, 2016	Haleakala	Pan-STARRS 1	·	1.5 km	MPC · JPL
796349	2009 SZ_{392}	—	August 27, 2014	Haleakala	Pan-STARRS 1	·	1.2 km	MPC · JPL
796350	2009 SC_{393}	—	July 25, 2014	Haleakala	Pan-STARRS 1	·	2.1 km	MPC · JPL
796351	2009 SF_{393}	—	January 4, 2016	Haleakala	Pan-STARRS 1	·	1.2 km	MPC · JPL
796352	2009 SQ_{393}	—	September 25, 2009	Catalina	CSS	T_{j} (2.93)	2.0 km	MPC · JPL
796353	2009 SH_{397}	—	September 26, 2009	Kitt Peak	Spacewatch	·	1.1 km	MPC · JPL
796354	2009 SX_{398}	—	September 28, 2009	Kitt Peak	Spacewatch	·	1.5 km	MPC · JPL
796355	2009 SB_{399}	—	September 18, 2009	Kitt Peak	Spacewatch	·	1.4 km	MPC · JPL
796356	2009 SK_{399}	—	September 21, 2009	Mount Lemmon	Mount Lemmon Survey	·	1.3 km	MPC · JPL
796357	2009 SR_{403}	—	September 18, 2009	Mount Lemmon	Mount Lemmon Survey	·	1.0 km	MPC · JPL
796358	2009 SN_{406}	—	September 25, 2009	Kitt Peak	Spacewatch	·	2.0 km	MPC · JPL
796359	2009 SL_{408}	—	September 20, 2009	Mount Lemmon	Mount Lemmon Survey	·	1.6 km	MPC · JPL
796360	2009 SQ_{409}	—	September 17, 2009	Kitt Peak	Spacewatch	EOS	1.4 km	MPC · JPL
796361	2009 SZ_{409}	—	September 20, 2009	Kitt Peak	Spacewatch	·	1.4 km	MPC · JPL
796362	2009 SS_{412}	—	September 18, 2009	Kitt Peak	Spacewatch	L4	6.0 km	MPC · JPL
796363	2009 SQ_{413}	—	September 25, 2009	Kitt Peak	Spacewatch	EOS	1.3 km	MPC · JPL
796364	2009 SB_{414}	—	September 29, 2009	Mount Lemmon	Mount Lemmon Survey	·	940 m	MPC · JPL
796365	2009 SZ_{414}	—	September 25, 2009	Mount Lemmon	Mount Lemmon Survey	·	1.1 km	MPC · JPL
796366	2009 SH_{415}	—	September 17, 2009	Kitt Peak	Spacewatch	·	1.2 km	MPC · JPL
796367	2009 SQ_{416}	—	September 25, 2009	Kitt Peak	Spacewatch	·	1.1 km	MPC · JPL
796368	2009 SO_{420}	—	September 22, 2009	Kitt Peak	Spacewatch	L4	5.4 km	MPC · JPL
796369	2009 SS_{421}	—	September 18, 2009	Kitt Peak	Spacewatch	·	2.0 km	MPC · JPL
796370	2009 SD_{422}	—	September 22, 2009	Kitt Peak	Spacewatch	·	1.9 km	MPC · JPL
796371	2009 SD_{423}	—	September 29, 2009	Mount Lemmon	Mount Lemmon Survey	EOS	1.4 km	MPC · JPL
796372	2009 SS_{423}	—	September 28, 2009	Kitt Peak	Spacewatch	L4 · ERY	5.9 km	MPC · JPL
796373	2009 SY_{423}	—	September 16, 2009	Kitt Peak	Spacewatch	·	1.1 km	MPC · JPL
796374	2009 SA_{424}	—	September 25, 2009	Kitt Peak	Spacewatch	WIT	630 m	MPC · JPL
796375	2009 SE_{425}	—	September 20, 2009	Kitt Peak	Spacewatch	·	1.2 km	MPC · JPL
796376	2009 SF_{425}	—	September 29, 2009	Mount Lemmon	Mount Lemmon Survey	·	1.3 km	MPC · JPL
796377	2009 SR_{426}	—	September 19, 2009	Kitt Peak	Spacewatch	·	3.0 km	MPC · JPL
796378	2009 SZ_{428}	—	September 18, 2009	Kitt Peak	Spacewatch	DOR	1.4 km	MPC · JPL
796379	2009 TZ_{9}	—	September 29, 2009	Kitt Peak	Spacewatch	·	1.3 km	MPC · JPL
796380	2009 TD_{19}	—	September 26, 2009	Kitt Peak	Spacewatch	·	670 m	MPC · JPL
796381	2009 TD_{23}	—	October 14, 2009	Puebla de Don Fadrique	OAM	·	940 m	MPC · JPL
796382	2009 TT_{35}	—	September 27, 2009	Kitt Peak	Spacewatch	NYS	800 m	MPC · JPL
796383	2009 TA_{43}	—	October 1, 2009	Mount Lemmon	Mount Lemmon Survey	·	1.4 km	MPC · JPL
796384	2009 TY_{49}	—	October 14, 2009	Mount Lemmon	Mount Lemmon Survey	·	1.2 km	MPC · JPL
796385	2009 TB_{51}	—	March 29, 2012	Mount Lemmon	Mount Lemmon Survey	VER	1.8 km	MPC · JPL
796386	2009 TS_{51}	—	October 11, 2009	Mount Lemmon	Mount Lemmon Survey	·	1.3 km	MPC · JPL
796387	2009 TV_{54}	—	October 11, 2009	Mount Lemmon	Mount Lemmon Survey	NEM	1.3 km	MPC · JPL
796388	2009 TJ_{56}	—	October 1, 2009	Mount Lemmon	Mount Lemmon Survey	·	1.3 km	MPC · JPL
796389	2009 TZ_{56}	—	October 12, 2009	Mount Lemmon	Mount Lemmon Survey	·	1.6 km	MPC · JPL
796390	2009 UN_{21}	—	October 16, 2009	Mount Lemmon	Mount Lemmon Survey	·	1.0 km	MPC · JPL
796391	2009 UU_{23}	—	October 18, 2009	Mount Lemmon	Mount Lemmon Survey	KOR	820 m	MPC · JPL
796392	2009 UC_{32}	—	October 18, 2009	Mount Lemmon	Mount Lemmon Survey	·	1.4 km	MPC · JPL
796393	2009 UN_{32}	—	October 18, 2009	Mount Lemmon	Mount Lemmon Survey	·	1.2 km	MPC · JPL
796394	2009 UB_{36}	—	October 22, 2009	Mount Lemmon	Mount Lemmon Survey	·	1.4 km	MPC · JPL
796395	2009 UK_{46}	—	October 18, 2009	Mount Lemmon	Mount Lemmon Survey	·	900 m	MPC · JPL
796396	2009 UY_{47}	—	September 20, 2009	Kitt Peak	Spacewatch	DOR	1.3 km	MPC · JPL
796397	2009 UW_{48}	—	October 22, 2009	Mount Lemmon	Mount Lemmon Survey	·	1.2 km	MPC · JPL
796398	2009 UH_{64}	—	October 17, 2009	Mount Lemmon	Mount Lemmon Survey	·	1.1 km	MPC · JPL
796399	2009 UR_{65}	—	October 17, 2009	Mount Lemmon	Mount Lemmon Survey	·	1.2 km	MPC · JPL
796400	2009 UH_{66}	—	September 25, 2009	Kitt Peak	Spacewatch	·	1.1 km	MPC · JPL

== 796401–796500 ==
back to top

Designation			Discovery			Properties		Ref
Permanent	Provisional	Named after	Date	Site	Discoverer(s)	Category	Diam.	Ref
796401	2009 UL_{67}	—	October 17, 2009	Mount Lemmon	Mount Lemmon Survey	·	2.2 km	MPC · JPL
796402	2009 UW_{68}	—	August 29, 2009	Kitt Peak	Spacewatch	(2076)	550 m	MPC · JPL
796403	2009 UL_{75}	—	September 20, 2009	Kitt Peak	Spacewatch	·	790 m	MPC · JPL
796404	2009 UY_{75}	—	September 18, 2009	Kitt Peak	Spacewatch	·	1.2 km	MPC · JPL
796405	2009 US_{76}	—	October 21, 2009	Mount Lemmon	Mount Lemmon Survey	·	1.3 km	MPC · JPL
796406	2009 UQ_{77}	—	October 21, 2009	Mount Lemmon	Mount Lemmon Survey	·	1.2 km	MPC · JPL
796407	2009 UO_{80}	—	October 22, 2009	Mount Lemmon	Mount Lemmon Survey	·	2.2 km	MPC · JPL
796408	2009 UA_{86}	—	September 16, 2009	Mount Lemmon	Mount Lemmon Survey	·	1.4 km	MPC · JPL
796409	2009 UM_{100}	—	October 23, 2009	Mount Lemmon	Mount Lemmon Survey	·	840 m	MPC · JPL
796410	2009 UW_{106}	—	October 22, 2009	Mount Lemmon	Mount Lemmon Survey	·	780 m	MPC · JPL
796411	2009 UX_{118}	—	October 23, 2009	Mount Lemmon	Mount Lemmon Survey	·	580 m	MPC · JPL
796412	2009 UQ_{120}	—	October 23, 2009	Mount Lemmon	Mount Lemmon Survey	·	3.1 km	MPC · JPL
796413	2009 UJ_{124}	—	October 26, 2009	Mount Lemmon	Mount Lemmon Survey	·	1.3 km	MPC · JPL
796414	2009 UM_{125}	—	October 26, 2009	Mount Lemmon	Mount Lemmon Survey	(5)	660 m	MPC · JPL
796415	2009 UK_{135}	—	February 28, 2016	Haleakala	Pan-STARRS 1	·	1.3 km	MPC · JPL
796416	2009 UF_{142}	—	October 18, 2009	Mount Lemmon	Mount Lemmon Survey	·	1.2 km	MPC · JPL
796417	2009 UG_{149}	—	October 24, 2009	Kitt Peak	Spacewatch	·	1.2 km	MPC · JPL
796418	2009 UK_{153}	—	September 21, 2009	Mount Lemmon	Mount Lemmon Survey	·	1.2 km	MPC · JPL
796419	2009 UC_{159}	—	February 8, 2011	Mount Lemmon	Mount Lemmon Survey	KOR	1.0 km	MPC · JPL
796420	2009 UF_{160}	—	October 23, 2009	Mount Lemmon	Mount Lemmon Survey	·	1.9 km	MPC · JPL
796421	2009 UB_{166}	—	October 22, 2009	Mount Lemmon	Mount Lemmon Survey	·	1.3 km	MPC · JPL
796422	2009 UJ_{167}	—	October 22, 2009	Mount Lemmon	Mount Lemmon Survey	·	1.4 km	MPC · JPL
796423	2009 UK_{168}	—	August 4, 2013	Haleakala	Pan-STARRS 1	·	1.2 km	MPC · JPL
796424	2009 UR_{170}	—	September 20, 2014	Haleakala	Pan-STARRS 1	·	1.2 km	MPC · JPL
796425	2009 UT_{170}	—	January 30, 2011	Haleakala	Pan-STARRS 1	·	470 m	MPC · JPL
796426	2009 UL_{171}	—	October 24, 2009	Kitt Peak	Spacewatch	·	810 m	MPC · JPL
796427	2009 UJ_{172}	—	October 26, 2009	Mount Lemmon	Mount Lemmon Survey	·	1.0 km	MPC · JPL
796428	2009 UQ_{173}	—	October 18, 2009	Mount Lemmon	Mount Lemmon Survey	·	1.8 km	MPC · JPL
796429	2009 UH_{175}	—	October 16, 2009	Mount Lemmon	Mount Lemmon Survey	·	1.4 km	MPC · JPL
796430	2009 UC_{177}	—	October 16, 2009	Mount Lemmon	Mount Lemmon Survey	THM	1.4 km	MPC · JPL
796431	2009 UX_{177}	—	October 26, 2009	Mount Lemmon	Mount Lemmon Survey	·	2.7 km	MPC · JPL
796432	2009 UX_{183}	—	October 24, 2009	Kitt Peak	Spacewatch	·	2.4 km	MPC · JPL
796433	2009 UO_{185}	—	October 17, 2009	Mount Lemmon	Mount Lemmon Survey	EOS	1.0 km	MPC · JPL
796434	2009 UZ_{189}	—	October 18, 2009	Mount Lemmon	Mount Lemmon Survey	L4	5.3 km	MPC · JPL
796435	2009 UX_{190}	—	October 24, 2009	Kitt Peak	Spacewatch	·	1.2 km	MPC · JPL
796436	2009 UK_{191}	—	October 16, 2009	Mount Lemmon	Mount Lemmon Survey	·	1.8 km	MPC · JPL
796437	2009 UU_{191}	—	October 16, 2009	Mount Lemmon	Mount Lemmon Survey	L4	5.9 km	MPC · JPL
796438	2009 UZ_{191}	—	October 22, 2009	Mount Lemmon	Mount Lemmon Survey	·	1.5 km	MPC · JPL
796439	2009 UB_{192}	—	October 16, 2009	Mount Lemmon	Mount Lemmon Survey	·	1.3 km	MPC · JPL
796440	2009 UT_{192}	—	October 16, 2009	Mount Lemmon	Mount Lemmon Survey	·	1.1 km	MPC · JPL
796441	2009 US_{194}	—	October 17, 2009	Mount Lemmon	Mount Lemmon Survey	·	1.7 km	MPC · JPL
796442	2009 UT_{194}	—	October 24, 2009	Kitt Peak	Spacewatch	·	1.3 km	MPC · JPL
796443	2009 UC_{197}	—	October 27, 2009	Kitt Peak	Spacewatch	·	1.3 km	MPC · JPL
796444	2009 UD_{197}	—	October 23, 2009	Mount Lemmon	Mount Lemmon Survey	·	1.2 km	MPC · JPL
796445	2009 UH_{197}	—	October 16, 2009	Mount Lemmon	Mount Lemmon Survey	·	1.4 km	MPC · JPL
796446	2009 VQ_{1}	—	October 1, 2009	Mount Lemmon	Mount Lemmon Survey	H	530 m	MPC · JPL
796447	2009 VO_{5}	—	September 22, 2009	Mount Lemmon	Mount Lemmon Survey	·	860 m	MPC · JPL
796448	2009 VQ_{9}	—	October 23, 2009	Mount Lemmon	Mount Lemmon Survey	·	1.4 km	MPC · JPL
796449	2009 VJ_{12}	—	November 8, 2009	Mount Lemmon	Mount Lemmon Survey	·	2.2 km	MPC · JPL
796450	2009 VT_{13}	—	September 28, 1998	Kitt Peak	Spacewatch	·	750 m	MPC · JPL
796451	2009 VF_{19}	—	November 9, 2009	Kachina	Hobart, J.	·	590 m	MPC · JPL
796452	2009 VR_{27}	—	October 22, 2009	Mount Lemmon	Mount Lemmon Survey	·	1.1 km	MPC · JPL
796453	2009 VL_{28}	—	July 27, 2005	Palomar Mountain	NEAT	NYS	970 m	MPC · JPL
796454	2009 VL_{31}	—	September 17, 2004	Kitt Peak	Spacewatch	·	1.2 km	MPC · JPL
796455	2009 VX_{33}	—	November 10, 2009	Mount Lemmon	Mount Lemmon Survey	·	1.3 km	MPC · JPL
796456	2009 VF_{34}	—	October 24, 2009	Kitt Peak	Spacewatch	·	1.3 km	MPC · JPL
796457	2009 VM_{43}	—	November 12, 2009	Punaʻauia	Teamo, N.	·	2.0 km	MPC · JPL
796458	2009 VP_{45}	—	October 18, 2009	Mount Lemmon	Mount Lemmon Survey	NYS	730 m	MPC · JPL
796459	2009 VJ_{54}	—	November 10, 2009	Mount Lemmon	Mount Lemmon Survey	WIT	650 m	MPC · JPL
796460	2009 VY_{69}	—	November 9, 2009	Mount Lemmon	Mount Lemmon Survey	·	930 m	MPC · JPL
796461	2009 VM_{87}	—	November 10, 2009	Kitt Peak	Spacewatch	·	2.0 km	MPC · JPL
796462	2009 VB_{98}	—	November 9, 2009	Mount Lemmon	Mount Lemmon Survey	·	1.6 km	MPC · JPL
796463	2009 VX_{99}	—	November 9, 2009	Mount Lemmon	Mount Lemmon Survey	·	910 m	MPC · JPL
796464	2009 VS_{102}	—	November 11, 2009	Kitt Peak	Spacewatch	·	1.1 km	MPC · JPL
796465	2009 VY_{106}	—	September 29, 2009	Mount Lemmon	Mount Lemmon Survey	·	1.5 km	MPC · JPL
796466	2009 VX_{112}	—	November 9, 2009	Kitt Peak	Spacewatch	·	920 m	MPC · JPL
796467	2009 VZ_{119}	—	November 10, 2009	Mount Lemmon	Mount Lemmon Survey	V	560 m	MPC · JPL
796468	2009 VM_{125}	—	October 18, 2014	Mount Lemmon	Mount Lemmon Survey	EOS	1.2 km	MPC · JPL
796469	2009 VU_{125}	—	November 9, 2009	Mount Lemmon	Mount Lemmon Survey	·	2.2 km	MPC · JPL
796470	2009 VE_{126}	—	November 8, 2009	Kitt Peak	Spacewatch	·	2.2 km	MPC · JPL
796471	2009 VS_{126}	—	November 11, 2009	Mount Lemmon	Mount Lemmon Survey	·	1.3 km	MPC · JPL
796472	2009 VR_{127}	—	November 11, 2009	Kitt Peak	Spacewatch	V	470 m	MPC · JPL
796473	2009 VO_{129}	—	November 10, 2009	Mount Lemmon	Mount Lemmon Survey	EOS	1.6 km	MPC · JPL
796474	2009 VS_{131}	—	November 10, 2009	Kitt Peak	Spacewatch	·	2.5 km	MPC · JPL
796475	2009 VG_{132}	—	November 9, 2009	Mount Lemmon	Mount Lemmon Survey	·	2.1 km	MPC · JPL
796476	2009 VK_{132}	—	November 9, 2009	Mount Lemmon	Mount Lemmon Survey	·	1.7 km	MPC · JPL
796477	2009 VA_{133}	—	November 11, 2009	Kitt Peak	Spacewatch	·	990 m	MPC · JPL
796478	2009 WF	—	November 16, 2009	Catalina	CSS	APO	390 m	MPC · JPL
796479	2009 WD_{19}	—	November 17, 2009	Mount Lemmon	Mount Lemmon Survey	EOS	1.3 km	MPC · JPL
796480	2009 WP_{30}	—	November 16, 2009	Kitt Peak	Spacewatch	·	1.1 km	MPC · JPL
796481	2009 WV_{36}	—	October 22, 2009	Mount Lemmon	Mount Lemmon Survey	·	770 m	MPC · JPL
796482	2009 WJ_{54}	—	September 28, 2009	Mount Lemmon	Mount Lemmon Survey	·	700 m	MPC · JPL
796483	2009 WQ_{57}	—	October 25, 2009	Kitt Peak	Spacewatch	·	1.3 km	MPC · JPL
796484	2009 WA_{63}	—	November 16, 2009	Mount Lemmon	Mount Lemmon Survey	·	1.2 km	MPC · JPL
796485	2009 WC_{72}	—	November 18, 2009	Kitt Peak	Spacewatch	·	1.5 km	MPC · JPL
796486	2009 WJ_{73}	—	October 26, 2009	Kitt Peak	Spacewatch	·	670 m	MPC · JPL
796487	2009 WF_{75}	—	November 18, 2009	Kitt Peak	Spacewatch	·	1.0 km	MPC · JPL
796488	2009 WO_{95}	—	October 12, 2009	Mount Lemmon	Mount Lemmon Survey	·	780 m	MPC · JPL
796489	2009 WO_{96}	—	November 20, 2009	Mount Lemmon	Mount Lemmon Survey	·	1.3 km	MPC · JPL
796490	2009 WW_{98}	—	November 21, 2009	Kitt Peak	Spacewatch	·	1.4 km	MPC · JPL
796491	2009 WK_{110}	—	November 17, 2009	Mount Lemmon	Mount Lemmon Survey	HOF	1.9 km	MPC · JPL
796492	2009 WV_{111}	—	November 17, 2009	Mount Lemmon	Mount Lemmon Survey	HOF	1.6 km	MPC · JPL
796493	2009 WG_{124}	—	November 20, 2009	Kitt Peak	Spacewatch	V	480 m	MPC · JPL
796494	2009 WR_{125}	—	November 10, 2009	Kitt Peak	Spacewatch	·	1.4 km	MPC · JPL
796495	2009 WN_{126}	—	November 20, 2009	Kitt Peak	Spacewatch	·	1.3 km	MPC · JPL
796496	2009 WD_{134}	—	March 9, 2007	Mount Lemmon	Mount Lemmon Survey	·	860 m	MPC · JPL
796497	2009 WP_{141}	—	November 18, 2009	Mount Lemmon	Mount Lemmon Survey	L4	5.6 km	MPC · JPL
796498	2009 WL_{146}	—	May 8, 2008	Kitt Peak	Spacewatch	·	1.4 km	MPC · JPL
796499	2009 WZ_{148}	—	October 14, 2009	Mount Lemmon	Mount Lemmon Survey	·	1.3 km	MPC · JPL
796500	2009 WH_{149}	—	November 19, 2009	Mount Lemmon	Mount Lemmon Survey	·	1.4 km	MPC · JPL

== 796501–796600 ==
back to top

Designation			Discovery			Properties		Ref
Permanent	Provisional	Named after	Date	Site	Discoverer(s)	Category	Diam.	Ref
796501	2009 WE_{151}	—	November 19, 2009	Mount Lemmon	Mount Lemmon Survey	·	590 m	MPC · JPL
796502	2009 WB_{154}	—	August 27, 2003	Palomar Mountain	NEAT	·	2.5 km	MPC · JPL
796503	2009 WT_{155}	—	November 20, 2009	Kitt Peak	Spacewatch	·	1.1 km	MPC · JPL
796504	2009 WS_{157}	—	November 20, 2009	Mount Lemmon	Mount Lemmon Survey	·	1.3 km	MPC · JPL
796505	2009 WL_{168}	—	October 27, 2009	Kitt Peak	Spacewatch	·	900 m	MPC · JPL
796506	2009 WZ_{170}	—	October 26, 2009	Kitt Peak	Spacewatch	EUN	1 km	MPC · JPL
796507	2009 WM_{172}	—	January 21, 2020	Haleakala	Pan-STARRS 2	DOR	1.3 km	MPC · JPL
796508	2009 WX_{182}	—	November 23, 2009	Mount Lemmon	Mount Lemmon Survey	·	2.0 km	MPC · JPL
796509	2009 WD_{187}	—	March 10, 2007	Mount Lemmon	Mount Lemmon Survey	·	810 m	MPC · JPL
796510	2009 WG_{190}	—	November 24, 2009	Kitt Peak	Spacewatch	·	1.3 km	MPC · JPL
796511	2009 WE_{191}	—	November 24, 2009	Mount Lemmon	Mount Lemmon Survey	·	1.4 km	MPC · JPL
796512	2009 WD_{193}	—	September 22, 2009	Mount Lemmon	Mount Lemmon Survey	·	930 m	MPC · JPL
796513	2009 WP_{194}	—	November 24, 2009	Kitt Peak	Spacewatch	THM	1.5 km	MPC · JPL
796514	2009 WX_{198}	—	November 26, 2009	Mount Lemmon	Mount Lemmon Survey	·	1.5 km	MPC · JPL
796515	2009 WO_{214}	—	November 20, 2009	Kitt Peak	Spacewatch	(29841)	1.1 km	MPC · JPL
796516	2009 WD_{224}	—	November 16, 2009	Mount Lemmon	Mount Lemmon Survey	·	1.8 km	MPC · JPL
796517	2009 WS_{234}	—	July 11, 2005	Mount Lemmon	Mount Lemmon Survey	·	920 m	MPC · JPL
796518	2009 WS_{246}	—	November 8, 2009	Mount Lemmon	Mount Lemmon Survey	·	820 m	MPC · JPL
796519	2009 WO_{253}	—	November 16, 2009	Mount Lemmon	Mount Lemmon Survey	AEO	820 m	MPC · JPL
796520	2009 WD_{254}	—	November 9, 2009	Kitt Peak	Spacewatch	·	860 m	MPC · JPL
796521	2009 WZ_{258}	—	November 8, 2009	Kitt Peak	Spacewatch	·	860 m	MPC · JPL
796522	2009 WB_{264}	—	November 17, 2009	Siding Spring	SSS	·	1.2 km	MPC · JPL
796523	2009 WR_{270}	—	November 19, 2009	Kitt Peak	Spacewatch	·	1.3 km	MPC · JPL
796524	2009 WY_{270}	—	November 27, 2009	Mount Lemmon	Mount Lemmon Survey	PHO	970 m	MPC · JPL
796525	2009 WJ_{272}	—	January 4, 2014	Haleakala	Pan-STARRS 1	·	940 m	MPC · JPL
796526	2009 WQ_{275}	—	September 6, 2013	Kitt Peak	Spacewatch	·	1.3 km	MPC · JPL
796527	2009 WY_{275}	—	June 16, 2012	Haleakala	Pan-STARRS 1	·	1.1 km	MPC · JPL
796528	2009 WN_{276}	—	December 28, 2005	Kitt Peak	Spacewatch	(5)	910 m	MPC · JPL
796529	2009 WP_{278}	—	August 19, 2012	Siding Spring	SSS	·	700 m	MPC · JPL
796530	2009 WT_{278}	—	October 15, 2014	Kitt Peak	Spacewatch	·	1.6 km	MPC · JPL
796531	2009 WU_{278}	—	November 25, 2009	Kitt Peak	Spacewatch	·	650 m	MPC · JPL
796532	2009 WD_{279}	—	July 24, 2015	Haleakala	Pan-STARRS 1	·	660 m	MPC · JPL
796533	2009 WT_{279}	—	June 13, 2015	Haleakala	Pan-STARRS 1	·	680 m	MPC · JPL
796534	2009 WZ_{279}	—	February 8, 2011	Mount Lemmon	Mount Lemmon Survey	EOS	1.3 km	MPC · JPL
796535	2009 WK_{281}	—	November 23, 2009	Kitt Peak	Spacewatch	V	510 m	MPC · JPL
796536	2009 WD_{284}	—	November 17, 2009	Mount Lemmon	Mount Lemmon Survey	·	2.0 km	MPC · JPL
796537	2009 WH_{284}	—	October 17, 2014	Mount Lemmon	Mount Lemmon Survey	·	1.5 km	MPC · JPL
796538	2009 WA_{286}	—	April 1, 2016	Mount Lemmon	Mount Lemmon Survey	·	1.4 km	MPC · JPL
796539	2009 WC_{287}	—	April 27, 2012	Haleakala	Pan-STARRS 1	·	2.4 km	MPC · JPL
796540	2009 WM_{287}	—	November 27, 2009	Kitt Peak	Spacewatch	·	1.2 km	MPC · JPL
796541	2009 WF_{289}	—	November 21, 2009	Kitt Peak	Spacewatch	·	660 m	MPC · JPL
796542	2009 WT_{289}	—	November 23, 2009	Mount Lemmon	Mount Lemmon Survey	·	1.5 km	MPC · JPL
796543	2009 WO_{291}	—	November 17, 2009	Kitt Peak	Spacewatch	·	700 m	MPC · JPL
796544	2009 WR_{292}	—	November 17, 2009	Mount Lemmon	Mount Lemmon Survey	·	1.6 km	MPC · JPL
796545	2009 WK_{294}	—	November 22, 2009	Kitt Peak	Spacewatch	EUN	1.1 km	MPC · JPL
796546	2009 WR_{294}	—	November 26, 2009	Kitt Peak	Spacewatch	·	1.4 km	MPC · JPL
796547	2009 WG_{297}	—	November 17, 2009	Mount Lemmon	Mount Lemmon Survey	EUN	860 m	MPC · JPL
796548	2009 WX_{298}	—	November 24, 2009	Kitt Peak	Spacewatch	·	2.5 km	MPC · JPL
796549	2009 WW_{299}	—	November 17, 2009	Mount Lemmon	Mount Lemmon Survey	L4	5.5 km	MPC · JPL
796550	2009 WG_{300}	—	November 20, 2009	Mount Lemmon	Mount Lemmon Survey	·	2.4 km	MPC · JPL
796551	2009 WH_{300}	—	November 24, 2009	Kitt Peak	Spacewatch	·	1.8 km	MPC · JPL
796552	2009 WV_{300}	—	November 27, 2009	Mount Lemmon	Mount Lemmon Survey	·	930 m	MPC · JPL
796553	2009 WG_{301}	—	November 24, 2009	Kitt Peak	Spacewatch	·	1.2 km	MPC · JPL
796554	2009 WB_{302}	—	November 24, 2009	Kitt Peak	Spacewatch	·	1.2 km	MPC · JPL
796555	2009 XM_{4}	—	December 10, 2009	Mount Lemmon	Mount Lemmon Survey	THM	1.6 km	MPC · JPL
796556	2009 XF_{28}	—	April 4, 2017	Haleakala	Pan-STARRS 1	·	2.6 km	MPC · JPL
796557	2009 XN_{28}	—	September 15, 2017	Haleakala	Pan-STARRS 1	·	1.0 km	MPC · JPL
796558	2009 YV_{7}	—	November 20, 2009	Mount Lemmon	Mount Lemmon Survey	PHO	890 m	MPC · JPL
796559	2009 YB_{28}	—	August 13, 2012	Haleakala	Pan-STARRS 1	·	1.1 km	MPC · JPL
796560	2009 YD_{31}	—	November 9, 2013	Kitt Peak	Spacewatch	·	870 m	MPC · JPL
796561	2009 YR_{31}	—	December 18, 2009	Kitt Peak	Spacewatch	EUN	940 m	MPC · JPL
796562	2009 YB_{32}	—	December 17, 2009	Mount Lemmon	Mount Lemmon Survey	·	1.5 km	MPC · JPL
796563	2009 YG_{32}	—	December 18, 2009	Mount Lemmon	Mount Lemmon Survey	·	2.0 km	MPC · JPL
796564	2010 AZ	—	January 4, 2010	Kitt Peak	Spacewatch	PHO	660 m	MPC · JPL
796565	2010 AQ_{1}	—	January 5, 2010	Kitt Peak	Spacewatch	·	1.8 km	MPC · JPL
796566	2010 AN_{10}	—	January 6, 2010	Mount Lemmon	Mount Lemmon Survey	·	1.4 km	MPC · JPL
796567	2010 AA_{14}	—	January 7, 2010	Kitt Peak	Spacewatch	HOF	1.7 km	MPC · JPL
796568	2010 AK_{21}	—	November 3, 2005	Mount Lemmon	Mount Lemmon Survey	NYS	870 m	MPC · JPL
796569	2010 AY_{26}	—	January 6, 2010	Mount Lemmon	Mount Lemmon Survey	THM	1.5 km	MPC · JPL
796570	2010 AV_{46}	—	November 27, 2009	Kitt Peak	Spacewatch	EUN	830 m	MPC · JPL
796571	2010 AU_{51}	—	October 9, 2008	Mount Lemmon	Mount Lemmon Survey	·	2.3 km	MPC · JPL
796572	2010 AZ_{64}	—	December 19, 2009	Kitt Peak	Spacewatch	·	1.1 km	MPC · JPL
796573	2010 AL_{140}	—	October 8, 2008	Kitt Peak	Spacewatch	·	2.1 km	MPC · JPL
796574	2010 AM_{152}	—	January 28, 2015	Haleakala	Pan-STARRS 1	·	1.5 km	MPC · JPL
796575	2010 AN_{160}	—	November 21, 2014	Mount Lemmon	Mount Lemmon Survey	·	2.0 km	MPC · JPL
796576	2010 AU_{163}	—	January 12, 2010	Kitt Peak	Spacewatch	·	620 m	MPC · JPL
796577	2010 AA_{165}	—	January 11, 2010	Kitt Peak	Spacewatch	VER	2.1 km	MPC · JPL
796578	2010 BR_{144}	—	September 16, 2017	Haleakala	Pan-STARRS 1	TEL	1.0 km	MPC · JPL
796579	2010 BJ_{146}	—	November 25, 2009	Mount Lemmon	Mount Lemmon Survey	·	1.5 km	MPC · JPL
796580	2010 BK_{148}	—	April 20, 2010	Mount Lemmon	Mount Lemmon Survey	·	1.4 km	MPC · JPL
796581	2010 CX_{26}	—	January 8, 2010	Kitt Peak	Spacewatch	·	1.5 km	MPC · JPL
796582	2010 CJ_{27}	—	September 5, 2008	Kitt Peak	Spacewatch	·	990 m	MPC · JPL
796583	2010 CT_{36}	—	February 13, 2010	Mount Lemmon	Mount Lemmon Survey	·	1.4 km	MPC · JPL
796584	2010 CZ_{54}	—	February 15, 2010	Catalina	CSS	·	910 m	MPC · JPL
796585	2010 CH_{55}	—	February 15, 2010	Mount Lemmon	Mount Lemmon Survey	AMO	390 m	MPC · JPL
796586	2010 CM_{72}	—	January 6, 2010	Kitt Peak	Spacewatch	·	990 m	MPC · JPL
796587	2010 CA_{77}	—	February 13, 2010	Mount Lemmon	Mount Lemmon Survey	H	350 m	MPC · JPL
796588	2010 CD_{79}	—	September 24, 2008	Catalina	CSS	·	1.5 km	MPC · JPL
796589	2010 CY_{82}	—	January 10, 2010	Kitt Peak	Spacewatch	·	1.4 km	MPC · JPL
796590	2010 CG_{84}	—	February 14, 2010	Kitt Peak	Spacewatch	DOR	1.6 km	MPC · JPL
796591	2010 CB_{87}	—	February 14, 2010	Mount Lemmon	Mount Lemmon Survey	EOS	1.1 km	MPC · JPL
796592	2010 CW_{94}	—	December 2, 2005	Mauna Kea	A. Boattini	·	860 m	MPC · JPL
796593	2010 CZ_{102}	—	February 14, 2010	Mount Lemmon	Mount Lemmon Survey	ARM	2.6 km	MPC · JPL
796594	2010 CO_{104}	—	January 12, 2010	Kitt Peak	Spacewatch	·	1.1 km	MPC · JPL
796595	2010 CO_{119}	—	February 15, 2010	Kitt Peak	Spacewatch	·	1.1 km	MPC · JPL
796596	2010 CO_{120}	—	December 4, 2005	Kitt Peak	Spacewatch	MAS	620 m	MPC · JPL
796597	2010 CW_{121}	—	February 15, 2010	Mount Lemmon	Mount Lemmon Survey	·	2.4 km	MPC · JPL
796598	2010 CM_{122}	—	February 15, 2010	Mount Lemmon	Mount Lemmon Survey	·	2.2 km	MPC · JPL
796599	2010 CS_{149}	—	February 14, 2010	Kitt Peak	Spacewatch	NYS	810 m	MPC · JPL
796600	2010 CB_{159}	—	February 15, 2010	Mount Lemmon	Mount Lemmon Survey	·	1.2 km	MPC · JPL

== 796601–796700 ==
back to top

Designation			Discovery			Properties		Ref
Permanent	Provisional	Named after	Date	Site	Discoverer(s)	Category	Diam.	Ref
796601	2010 CJ_{167}	—	February 14, 2010	Mount Lemmon	Mount Lemmon Survey	·	670 m	MPC · JPL
796602	2010 CF_{271}	—	November 23, 2014	Haleakala	Pan-STARRS 1	TIR	2.0 km	MPC · JPL
796603	2010 CV_{273}	—	April 25, 2015	Haleakala	Pan-STARRS 1	·	1.1 km	MPC · JPL
796604	2010 CF_{278}	—	August 6, 2018	Haleakala	Pan-STARRS 1	·	2.0 km	MPC · JPL
796605	2010 DZ_{2}	—	February 16, 2010	Kitt Peak	Spacewatch	·	1.7 km	MPC · JPL
796606	2010 DZ_{9}	—	February 16, 2010	Mount Lemmon	Mount Lemmon Survey	·	1.2 km	MPC · JPL
796607	2010 DF_{11}	—	February 16, 2010	Mount Lemmon	Mount Lemmon Survey	·	2.3 km	MPC · JPL
796608	2010 DW_{35}	—	February 16, 2010	Kitt Peak	Spacewatch	·	1.0 km	MPC · JPL
796609	2010 DS_{41}	—	February 17, 2010	Mount Lemmon	Mount Lemmon Survey	·	1.3 km	MPC · JPL
796610	2010 DA_{42}	—	February 17, 2010	Mount Lemmon	Mount Lemmon Survey	KOR	950 m	MPC · JPL
796611	2010 DG_{93}	—	February 17, 2010	Mount Lemmon	Mount Lemmon Survey	VER	2.1 km	MPC · JPL
796612	2010 DX_{99}	—	February 23, 2010	WISE	WISE	·	2.7 km	MPC · JPL
796613	2010 DG_{107}	—	August 26, 2012	Haleakala	Pan-STARRS 1	·	900 m	MPC · JPL
796614	2010 DN_{107}	—	March 25, 2014	Kitt Peak	Spacewatch	·	1.0 km	MPC · JPL
796615	2010 DU_{107}	—	February 18, 2010	Mount Lemmon	Mount Lemmon Survey	·	1.3 km	MPC · JPL
796616	2010 DW_{107}	—	February 17, 2010	Kitt Peak	Spacewatch	·	760 m	MPC · JPL
796617	2010 DC_{113}	—	February 18, 2010	Mount Lemmon	Mount Lemmon Survey	·	1.2 km	MPC · JPL
796618	2010 DV_{113}	—	February 16, 2010	Mount Lemmon	Mount Lemmon Survey	EOS	1.3 km	MPC · JPL
796619	2010 DY_{113}	—	February 17, 2010	Kitt Peak	Spacewatch	·	1.9 km	MPC · JPL
796620	2010 DX_{115}	—	April 1, 2016	Haleakala	Pan-STARRS 1	VER	1.9 km	MPC · JPL
796621	2010 EG_{31}	—	March 4, 2010	Kitt Peak	Spacewatch	THM	1.4 km	MPC · JPL
796622	2010 EC_{71}	—	March 12, 2010	Mount Lemmon	Mount Lemmon Survey	·	1.0 km	MPC · JPL
796623	2010 EJ_{74}	—	February 18, 2010	Kitt Peak	Spacewatch	·	1.0 km	MPC · JPL
796624	2010 EK_{87}	—	March 13, 2010	Kitt Peak	Spacewatch	·	960 m	MPC · JPL
796625	2010 EA_{93}	—	March 14, 2010	Mount Lemmon	Mount Lemmon Survey	·	880 m	MPC · JPL
796626	2010 EM_{95}	—	October 29, 2008	Mount Lemmon	Mount Lemmon Survey	·	1.4 km	MPC · JPL
796627	2010 ES_{100}	—	March 15, 2010	Kitt Peak	Spacewatch	·	1.3 km	MPC · JPL
796628	2010 EB_{141}	—	March 12, 2010	Kitt Peak	Spacewatch	·	1.0 km	MPC · JPL
796629	2010 EM_{173}	—	March 14, 2010	Mount Lemmon	Mount Lemmon Survey	RAF	640 m	MPC · JPL
796630	2010 EP_{175}	—	January 1, 2016	Mount Lemmon	Mount Lemmon Survey	·	2.2 km	MPC · JPL
796631	2010 ER_{182}	—	March 10, 2010	WISE	WISE	·	1.5 km	MPC · JPL
796632	2010 EC_{190}	—	December 23, 2017	Haleakala	Pan-STARRS 1	·	920 m	MPC · JPL
796633	2010 EH_{190}	—	February 9, 2014	Mount Lemmon	Mount Lemmon Survey	·	860 m	MPC · JPL
796634	2010 EA_{191}	—	March 12, 2010	Mount Lemmon	Mount Lemmon Survey	·	1.7 km	MPC · JPL
796635	2010 EK_{191}	—	March 15, 2010	Mount Lemmon	Mount Lemmon Survey	·	700 m	MPC · JPL
796636	2010 EU_{191}	—	March 13, 2010	Mount Lemmon	Mount Lemmon Survey	EOS	1.4 km	MPC · JPL
796637	2010 FS_{2}	—	March 16, 2010	Mount Lemmon	Mount Lemmon Survey	·	1.5 km	MPC · JPL
796638	2010 FO_{26}	—	March 19, 2010	Mount Lemmon	Mount Lemmon Survey	·	2.1 km	MPC · JPL
796639	2010 FQ_{27}	—	March 20, 2010	Mount Lemmon	Mount Lemmon Survey	NAE	2.1 km	MPC · JPL
796640	2010 FU_{97}	—	March 18, 2010	Kitt Peak	Spacewatch	·	970 m	MPC · JPL
796641	2010 FC_{123}	—	March 2, 2006	Mount Lemmon	Mount Lemmon Survey	·	980 m	MPC · JPL
796642	2010 FZ_{133}	—	March 29, 2010	WISE	WISE	·	870 m	MPC · JPL
796643	2010 FB_{141}	—	October 8, 2012	Haleakala	Pan-STARRS 1	·	1.1 km	MPC · JPL
796644	2010 FQ_{143}	—	March 18, 2010	Mount Lemmon	Mount Lemmon Survey	·	1.2 km	MPC · JPL
796645	2010 FX_{144}	—	March 19, 2010	Kitt Peak	Spacewatch	·	1.1 km	MPC · JPL
796646	2010 FH_{146}	—	March 19, 2010	Mount Lemmon	Mount Lemmon Survey	·	1.0 km	MPC · JPL
796647	2010 GY_{119}	—	April 11, 2010	Kitt Peak	Spacewatch	·	1.1 km	MPC · JPL
796648	2010 GF_{125}	—	April 8, 2010	Kitt Peak	Spacewatch	·	1.3 km	MPC · JPL
796649	2010 GP_{128}	—	April 4, 2010	Kitt Peak	Spacewatch	·	1.1 km	MPC · JPL
796650	2010 GQ_{133}	—	April 11, 2010	Mount Lemmon	Mount Lemmon Survey	PHO	1.3 km	MPC · JPL
796651	2010 GQ_{135}	—	March 21, 2010	Kitt Peak	Spacewatch	·	1.3 km	MPC · JPL
796652	2010 GC_{175}	—	March 21, 2010	Mount Lemmon	Mount Lemmon Survey	RAF	600 m	MPC · JPL
796653	2010 GU_{189}	—	January 8, 2010	Mount Lemmon	Mount Lemmon Survey	·	1.4 km	MPC · JPL
796654	2010 GV_{190}	—	April 11, 2010	WISE	WISE	·	1.7 km	MPC · JPL
796655	2010 GN_{191}	—	February 9, 2016	Haleakala	Pan-STARRS 1	·	2.0 km	MPC · JPL
796656	2010 GS_{195}	—	November 11, 2009	Mount Lemmon	Mount Lemmon Survey	·	970 m	MPC · JPL
796657	2010 GM_{201}	—	April 9, 2015	Mount Lemmon	Mount Lemmon Survey	·	1.3 km	MPC · JPL
796658	2010 GN_{203}	—	January 20, 2018	Haleakala	Pan-STARRS 1	·	860 m	MPC · JPL
796659	2010 GX_{205}	—	March 21, 2015	Haleakala	Pan-STARRS 1	·	1.4 km	MPC · JPL
796660	2010 GZ_{205}	—	February 28, 2014	Haleakala	Pan-STARRS 1	·	840 m	MPC · JPL
796661	2010 GX_{207}	—	April 10, 2010	Kitt Peak	Spacewatch	·	1.2 km	MPC · JPL
796662	2010 GV_{209}	—	April 9, 2010	Mount Lemmon	Mount Lemmon Survey	·	1.5 km	MPC · JPL
796663	2010 GY_{209}	—	April 10, 2010	Mount Lemmon	Mount Lemmon Survey	NEM	1.6 km	MPC · JPL
796664	2010 GF_{212}	—	April 9, 2010	Mount Lemmon	Mount Lemmon Survey	·	1.0 km	MPC · JPL
796665	2010 GS_{212}	—	April 9, 2010	Kitt Peak	Spacewatch	·	1.2 km	MPC · JPL
796666	2010 GU_{213}	—	April 10, 2010	Kitt Peak	Spacewatch	·	1.2 km	MPC · JPL
796667	2010 HT_{76}	—	April 17, 2010	Mount Lemmon	Mount Lemmon Survey	(194)	1.2 km	MPC · JPL
796668	2010 HQ_{116}	—	December 7, 2017	Haleakala	Pan-STARRS 1	·	1.0 km	MPC · JPL
796669	2010 HX_{129}	—	April 25, 2010	WISE	WISE	·	1.0 km	MPC · JPL
796670	2010 HU_{131}	—	March 30, 2015	Haleakala	Pan-STARRS 1	·	2.1 km	MPC · JPL
796671	2010 HK_{140}	—	April 25, 2010	Kitt Peak	Spacewatch	·	1.1 km	MPC · JPL
796672	2010 HW_{140}	—	March 30, 2016	Haleakala	Pan-STARRS 1	·	2.4 km	MPC · JPL
796673	2010 JA_{44}	—	May 4, 2010	Kitt Peak	Spacewatch	·	1.1 km	MPC · JPL
796674	2010 JG_{79}	—	May 11, 2010	Mount Lemmon	Mount Lemmon Survey	·	1.2 km	MPC · JPL
796675	2010 JN_{181}	—	August 1, 2016	Haleakala	Pan-STARRS 1	URS	2.3 km	MPC · JPL
796676	2010 JS_{182}	—	September 30, 2016	Haleakala	Pan-STARRS 1	·	1.9 km	MPC · JPL
796677	2010 JQ_{184}	—	October 2, 2013	Haleakala	Pan-STARRS 1	·	1.5 km	MPC · JPL
796678	2010 JQ_{187}	—	January 22, 2015	Haleakala	Pan-STARRS 1	GEF	850 m	MPC · JPL
796679	2010 JX_{196}	—	May 11, 2010	WISE	WISE	·	2.2 km	MPC · JPL
796680	2010 JN_{197}	—	March 4, 2014	Cerro Tololo	High Cadence Transient Survey	·	2.7 km	MPC · JPL
796681	2010 JR_{197}	—	May 11, 2010	WISE	WISE	·	1.1 km	MPC · JPL
796682	2010 JJ_{200}	—	July 17, 2016	Haleakala	Pan-STARRS 1	·	2.4 km	MPC · JPL
796683	2010 JS_{200}	—	June 23, 2015	Haleakala	Pan-STARRS 1	·	1.9 km	MPC · JPL
796684	2010 JO_{202}	—	February 13, 2010	Mount Lemmon	Mount Lemmon Survey	·	1.2 km	MPC · JPL
796685	2010 JE_{204}	—	May 4, 2014	Haleakala	Pan-STARRS 1	·	1.4 km	MPC · JPL
796686	2010 JJ_{209}	—	December 1, 2008	Kitt Peak	Spacewatch	·	2.1 km	MPC · JPL
796687	2010 JP_{209}	—	June 19, 2015	Haleakala	Pan-STARRS 1	·	1.8 km	MPC · JPL
796688	2010 JW_{214}	—	May 5, 2010	Mount Lemmon	Mount Lemmon Survey	·	1.1 km	MPC · JPL
796689	2010 JW_{215}	—	May 11, 2010	Mount Lemmon	Mount Lemmon Survey	·	2.2 km	MPC · JPL
796690	2010 KD_{39}	—	May 19, 2010	Kitt Peak	Spacewatch	·	1.4 km	MPC · JPL
796691	2010 KY_{61}	—	May 18, 2010	Puebla de Don Fadrique	OAM	·	840 m	MPC · JPL
796692	2010 KL_{133}	—	May 17, 2010	WISE	WISE	·	1.6 km	MPC · JPL
796693	2010 KU_{141}	—	September 3, 2010	Mount Lemmon	Mount Lemmon Survey	·	1.5 km	MPC · JPL
796694	2010 KD_{147}	—	July 26, 2017	Haleakala	Pan-STARRS 1	·	1.7 km	MPC · JPL
796695	2010 KP_{148}	—	May 25, 2010	WISE	WISE	·	2.7 km	MPC · JPL
796696	2010 KW_{150}	—	April 23, 2014	Cerro Tololo	DECam	·	1.2 km	MPC · JPL
796697	2010 KU_{152}	—	September 12, 2016	Haleakala	Pan-STARRS 1	EOS	1.5 km	MPC · JPL
796698	2010 KH_{158}	—	February 21, 2017	Haleakala	Pan-STARRS 1	3:2	3.6 km	MPC · JPL
796699	2010 KT_{160}	—	August 25, 2022	Haleakala	Pan-STARRS 1	·	1.8 km	MPC · JPL
796700	2010 LZ_{143}	—	September 10, 2010	Mount Lemmon	Mount Lemmon Survey	·	510 m	MPC · JPL

== 796701–796800 ==
back to top

Designation			Discovery			Properties		Ref
Permanent	Provisional	Named after	Date	Site	Discoverer(s)	Category	Diam.	Ref
796701	2010 LO_{148}	—	May 22, 2022	Haleakala	Pan-STARRS 2	·	2.4 km	MPC · JPL
796702	2010 LE_{150}	—	September 30, 2016	Haleakala	Pan-STARRS 1	·	2.5 km	MPC · JPL
796703	2010 LG_{151}	—	September 11, 2010	Mount Lemmon	Mount Lemmon Survey	·	2.4 km	MPC · JPL
796704	2010 LF_{152}	—	March 18, 2010	Mount Lemmon	Mount Lemmon Survey	·	2.1 km	MPC · JPL
796705	2010 LU_{153}	—	June 12, 2010	WISE	WISE	·	2.2 km	MPC · JPL
796706	2010 LN_{158}	—	April 8, 2014	Haleakala	Pan-STARRS 1	EUN	810 m	MPC · JPL
796707	2010 ME_{128}	—	September 27, 2016	Haleakala	Pan-STARRS 1	·	2.6 km	MPC · JPL
796708	2010 MQ_{129}	—	June 23, 2010	WISE	WISE	NAE	1.7 km	MPC · JPL
796709	2010 MM_{130}	—	October 22, 2016	Kitt Peak	Spacewatch	·	2.4 km	MPC · JPL
796710	2010 MN_{131}	—	September 3, 2010	Mount Lemmon	Mount Lemmon Survey	·	1.8 km	MPC · JPL
796711	2010 NP_{59}	—	July 11, 2010	WISE	WISE	·	2.5 km	MPC · JPL
796712	2010 NN_{123}	—	September 9, 2010	Kitt Peak	Spacewatch	·	2.7 km	MPC · JPL
796713	2010 NH_{138}	—	July 28, 2015	Haleakala	Pan-STARRS 1	·	1.3 km	MPC · JPL
796714	2010 NS_{146}	—	November 14, 2017	Mount Lemmon	Mount Lemmon Survey	·	590 m	MPC · JPL
796715	2010 NM_{147}	—	November 8, 2015	Mount Lemmon	Mount Lemmon Survey	(194)	1.2 km	MPC · JPL
796716	2010 OB_{134}	—	November 12, 2010	Mount Lemmon	Mount Lemmon Survey	·	910 m	MPC · JPL
796717	2010 OQ_{145}	—	May 22, 2014	Haleakala	Pan-STARRS 1	·	2.9 km	MPC · JPL
796718	2010 OC_{147}	—	July 27, 2010	WISE	WISE	·	2.3 km	MPC · JPL
796719	2010 OW_{148}	—	April 13, 2015	Haleakala	Pan-STARRS 1	·	1.1 km	MPC · JPL
796720	2010 PS_{22}	—	August 8, 2010	Dauban	C. Rinner, Kugel, F.	·	2.7 km	MPC · JPL
796721	2010 PG_{23}	—	August 6, 2010	Socorro	LINEAR	·	670 m	MPC · JPL
796722	2010 PT_{86}	—	May 14, 2010	Mount Lemmon	Mount Lemmon Survey	·	1.8 km	MPC · JPL
796723	2010 PN_{90}	—	August 13, 2010	Kitt Peak	Spacewatch	·	2.4 km	MPC · JPL
796724	2010 PX_{90}	—	August 10, 2010	Kitt Peak	Spacewatch	KOR	1.1 km	MPC · JPL
796725	2010 PD_{92}	—	August 13, 2010	Kitt Peak	Spacewatch	·	2.4 km	MPC · JPL
796726	2010 RH	—	September 1, 2010	Mount Lemmon	Mount Lemmon Survey	·	1.1 km	MPC · JPL
796727	2010 RU_{16}	—	September 2, 2010	Socorro	LINEAR	·	1.8 km	MPC · JPL
796728	2010 RT_{19}	—	November 4, 2005	Kitt Peak	Spacewatch	·	2.1 km	MPC · JPL
796729	2010 RG_{23}	—	September 3, 2010	Mount Lemmon	Mount Lemmon Survey	·	1.6 km	MPC · JPL
796730	2010 RC_{25}	—	March 29, 2009	Mount Lemmon	Mount Lemmon Survey	·	1.6 km	MPC · JPL
796731	2010 RP_{25}	—	April 2, 2009	Kitt Peak	Spacewatch	·	750 m	MPC · JPL
796732	2010 RL_{27}	—	September 3, 2010	Mount Lemmon	Mount Lemmon Survey	(5)	930 m	MPC · JPL
796733	2010 RY_{27}	—	September 3, 2010	Mount Lemmon	Mount Lemmon Survey	·	1.1 km	MPC · JPL
796734	2010 RP_{45}	—	September 6, 2010	Mount Lemmon	Mount Lemmon Survey	AMO	270 m	MPC · JPL
796735	2010 RM_{53}	—	September 3, 2010	Mount Lemmon	Mount Lemmon Survey	·	2.2 km	MPC · JPL
796736	2010 RS_{58}	—	September 5, 2010	Mount Lemmon	Mount Lemmon Survey	MRX	810 m	MPC · JPL
796737	2010 RY_{70}	—	September 2, 2010	Mount Lemmon	Mount Lemmon Survey	·	2.5 km	MPC · JPL
796738	2010 RP_{76}	—	September 11, 2010	Mount Lemmon	Mount Lemmon Survey	·	570 m	MPC · JPL
796739	2010 RK_{79}	—	September 2, 2010	Puebla de Don Fadrique	OAM	·	2.0 km	MPC · JPL
796740	2010 RK_{83}	—	September 1, 2010	Mount Lemmon	Mount Lemmon Survey	·	1.0 km	MPC · JPL
796741	2010 RQ_{87}	—	September 3, 2010	Mount Lemmon	Mount Lemmon Survey	·	1.5 km	MPC · JPL
796742	2010 RF_{90}	—	September 3, 2010	Mount Lemmon	Mount Lemmon Survey	H	460 m	MPC · JPL
796743	2010 RM_{100}	—	September 10, 2010	Kitt Peak	Spacewatch	·	980 m	MPC · JPL
796744	2010 RX_{114}	—	September 11, 2010	Kitt Peak	Spacewatch	EUN	960 m	MPC · JPL
796745	2010 RK_{118}	—	September 11, 2010	Kitt Peak	Spacewatch	·	620 m	MPC · JPL
796746	2010 RM_{121}	—	September 12, 2010	Mount Lemmon	Mount Lemmon Survey	H	450 m	MPC · JPL
796747	2010 RT_{128}	—	September 14, 2010	Kitt Peak	Spacewatch	·	1.5 km	MPC · JPL
796748	2010 RK_{129}	—	September 15, 2010	Mount Lemmon	Mount Lemmon Survey	·	2.4 km	MPC · JPL
796749	2010 RE_{130}	—	September 12, 2015	Haleakala	Pan-STARRS 1	KOR	970 m	MPC · JPL
796750	2010 RF_{134}	—	September 1, 2010	Mount Lemmon	Mount Lemmon Survey	MRX	880 m	MPC · JPL
796751	2010 RW_{135}	—	September 10, 2010	Kitt Peak	Spacewatch	H	460 m	MPC · JPL
796752	2010 RM_{137}	—	November 3, 2005	Mount Lemmon	Mount Lemmon Survey	EOS	1.3 km	MPC · JPL
796753	2010 RC_{145}	—	September 14, 2010	Kitt Peak	Spacewatch	·	1.7 km	MPC · JPL
796754	2010 RG_{145}	—	November 24, 2000	Kitt Peak	Deep Lens Survey	·	460 m	MPC · JPL
796755	2010 RN_{148}	—	September 15, 2010	Kitt Peak	Spacewatch	·	2.2 km	MPC · JPL
796756	2010 RH_{153}	—	September 15, 2010	Kitt Peak	Spacewatch	·	2.3 km	MPC · JPL
796757	2010 RT_{154}	—	September 15, 2010	Westfield	International Astronomical Search Collaboration	·	490 m	MPC · JPL
796758	2010 RX_{155}	—	September 15, 2010	Kitt Peak	Spacewatch	(5)	830 m	MPC · JPL
796759	2010 RK_{159}	—	September 2, 2010	Mount Lemmon	Mount Lemmon Survey	·	1.3 km	MPC · JPL
796760	2010 RG_{168}	—	September 2, 2010	Mount Lemmon	Mount Lemmon Survey	3:2	3.5 km	MPC · JPL
796761	2010 RL_{168}	—	September 18, 2006	Kitt Peak	Spacewatch	·	760 m	MPC · JPL
796762	2010 RR_{172}	—	September 5, 2010	Mount Lemmon	Mount Lemmon Survey	·	1.6 km	MPC · JPL
796763	2010 RR_{175}	—	September 9, 2010	Bisei	BATTeRS	H	320 m	MPC · JPL
796764	2010 RG_{178}	—	September 14, 2010	Mount Lemmon	Mount Lemmon Survey	·	2.0 km	MPC · JPL
796765	2010 RX_{181}	—	October 1, 2010	Puebla de Don Fadrique	OAM	H	540 m	MPC · JPL
796766	2010 RB_{192}	—	January 26, 2012	Haleakala	Pan-STARRS 1	·	490 m	MPC · JPL
796767	2010 RD_{194}	—	September 2, 2010	Mount Lemmon	Mount Lemmon Survey	·	850 m	MPC · JPL
796768	2010 RQ_{195}	—	September 11, 2010	Kitt Peak	Spacewatch	HYG	1.8 km	MPC · JPL
796769	2010 RZ_{203}	—	September 2, 2010	Mount Lemmon	Mount Lemmon Survey	·	2.3 km	MPC · JPL
796770	2010 RR_{205}	—	September 5, 2010	Mount Lemmon	Mount Lemmon Survey	·	1.2 km	MPC · JPL
796771	2010 RQ_{206}	—	September 12, 2010	Kitt Peak	Spacewatch	·	920 m	MPC · JPL
796772	2010 RR_{207}	—	September 5, 2010	Kitt Peak	Spacewatch	·	2.0 km	MPC · JPL
796773	2010 RF_{208}	—	September 4, 2010	Mount Lemmon	Mount Lemmon Survey	HYG	1.8 km	MPC · JPL
796774	2010 RD_{209}	—	September 2, 2010	Mount Lemmon	Mount Lemmon Survey	EOS	1.0 km	MPC · JPL
796775	2010 RK_{210}	—	September 2, 2010	Mount Lemmon	Mount Lemmon Survey	·	1.5 km	MPC · JPL
796776	2010 RN_{210}	—	September 5, 2010	Mount Lemmon	Mount Lemmon Survey	·	1.6 km	MPC · JPL
796777	2010 RU_{210}	—	September 11, 2010	Mount Lemmon	Mount Lemmon Survey	·	2.0 km	MPC · JPL
796778	2010 RY_{213}	—	September 4, 2010	Mount Lemmon	Mount Lemmon Survey	·	830 m	MPC · JPL
796779	2010 RW_{214}	—	September 4, 2010	Kitt Peak	Spacewatch	EOS	1.4 km	MPC · JPL
796780	2010 RS_{215}	—	September 11, 2010	Kitt Peak	Spacewatch	·	1.8 km	MPC · JPL
796781	2010 RR_{217}	—	September 12, 2010	ESA OGS	ESA OGS	THM	1.6 km	MPC · JPL
796782	2010 RX_{217}	—	September 9, 2010	Kitt Peak	Spacewatch	H	440 m	MPC · JPL
796783	2010 RD_{218}	—	September 3, 2010	Mount Lemmon	Mount Lemmon Survey	TIR	1.8 km	MPC · JPL
796784	2010 RA_{219}	—	September 15, 2010	Mount Lemmon	Mount Lemmon Survey	·	790 m	MPC · JPL
796785	2010 RN_{221}	—	September 11, 2010	Mount Lemmon	Mount Lemmon Survey	·	530 m	MPC · JPL
796786	2010 RL_{222}	—	September 10, 2010	Kitt Peak	Spacewatch	·	2.0 km	MPC · JPL
796787	2010 RK_{225}	—	September 2, 2010	Mount Lemmon	Mount Lemmon Survey	·	2.0 km	MPC · JPL
796788	2010 RC_{228}	—	September 4, 2010	Mount Lemmon	Mount Lemmon Survey	·	1.1 km	MPC · JPL
796789	2010 SV_{4}	—	September 16, 2010	Mount Lemmon	Mount Lemmon Survey	·	1.4 km	MPC · JPL
796790	2010 SD_{5}	—	September 16, 2010	Kitt Peak	Spacewatch	·	970 m	MPC · JPL
796791	2010 SS_{7}	—	September 17, 2010	Mount Lemmon	Mount Lemmon Survey	VER	2.0 km	MPC · JPL
796792	2010 SG_{17}	—	September 17, 2010	Kitt Peak	Spacewatch	·	2.0 km	MPC · JPL
796793	2010 ST_{23}	—	September 18, 2010	Mount Lemmon	Mount Lemmon Survey	VER	1.9 km	MPC · JPL
796794	2010 SO_{25}	—	September 29, 2010	Mount Lemmon	Mount Lemmon Survey	·	1 km	MPC · JPL
796795	2010 SF_{29}	—	September 29, 2010	Mount Lemmon	Mount Lemmon Survey	·	1.4 km	MPC · JPL
796796	2010 SM_{32}	—	September 30, 2010	Mount Lemmon	Mount Lemmon Survey	·	2.0 km	MPC · JPL
796797	2010 SP_{33}	—	May 21, 2014	Haleakala	Pan-STARRS 1	·	2.0 km	MPC · JPL
796798	2010 SQ_{34}	—	September 30, 2010	Mount Lemmon	Mount Lemmon Survey	·	1.1 km	MPC · JPL
796799	2010 SV_{37}	—	June 26, 2015	Haleakala	Pan-STARRS 1	·	2.0 km	MPC · JPL
796800	2010 SC_{47}	—	September 30, 2010	Mount Lemmon	Mount Lemmon Survey	HNS	870 m	MPC · JPL

== 796801–796900 ==
back to top

Designation			Discovery			Properties		Ref
Permanent	Provisional	Named after	Date	Site	Discoverer(s)	Category	Diam.	Ref
796801	2010 SZ_{47}	—	July 8, 2015	Haleakala	Pan-STARRS 1	H	410 m	MPC · JPL
796802	2010 SR_{50}	—	December 15, 2006	Kitt Peak	Spacewatch	AEO	840 m	MPC · JPL
796803	2010 SK_{56}	—	September 30, 2010	Mount Lemmon	Mount Lemmon Survey	·	1.3 km	MPC · JPL
796804	2010 SD_{57}	—	September 17, 2010	Mount Lemmon	Mount Lemmon Survey	·	1.2 km	MPC · JPL
796805	2010 SJ_{57}	—	September 17, 2010	Mount Lemmon	Mount Lemmon Survey	·	2.1 km	MPC · JPL
796806	2010 SQ_{57}	—	September 30, 2010	Mount Lemmon	Mount Lemmon Survey	·	1.1 km	MPC · JPL
796807	2010 SY_{58}	—	March 26, 2008	Mount Lemmon	Mount Lemmon Survey	·	1.5 km	MPC · JPL
796808	2010 SB_{60}	—	September 29, 2010	Mount Lemmon	Mount Lemmon Survey	·	1.8 km	MPC · JPL
796809	2010 SV_{60}	—	September 17, 2010	Mount Lemmon	Mount Lemmon Survey	EOS	1.4 km	MPC · JPL
796810	2010 SZ_{61}	—	September 18, 2010	Mount Lemmon	Mount Lemmon Survey	·	2.3 km	MPC · JPL
796811	2010 SX_{62}	—	September 18, 2010	Kitt Peak	Spacewatch	·	2.0 km	MPC · JPL
796812	2010 SD_{63}	—	September 29, 2010	Mount Lemmon	Mount Lemmon Survey	·	950 m	MPC · JPL
796813	2010 SS_{64}	—	September 18, 2010	Kitt Peak	Spacewatch	·	1.6 km	MPC · JPL
796814	2010 SB_{66}	—	September 30, 2010	Mount Lemmon	Mount Lemmon Survey	·	1.1 km	MPC · JPL
796815	2010 SE_{68}	—	September 30, 2010	Mount Lemmon	Mount Lemmon Survey	·	940 m	MPC · JPL
796816	2010 TQ	—	September 5, 2010	Mount Lemmon	Mount Lemmon Survey	THM	1.7 km	MPC · JPL
796817	2010 TX	—	September 5, 2010	Kitt Peak	Spacewatch	·	1.2 km	MPC · JPL
796818	2010 TP_{1}	—	October 1, 2010	Kitt Peak	Spacewatch	·	1.1 km	MPC · JPL
796819	2010 TC_{6}	—	September 16, 2010	Kitt Peak	Spacewatch	·	1.2 km	MPC · JPL
796820	2010 TQ_{10}	—	March 18, 2004	Kitt Peak	Spacewatch	H	440 m	MPC · JPL
796821	2010 TW_{20}	—	October 1, 2010	Kitt Peak	Spacewatch	·	1.0 km	MPC · JPL
796822	2010 TZ_{26}	—	November 10, 2006	Kitt Peak	Spacewatch	·	1.1 km	MPC · JPL
796823	2010 TX_{31}	—	October 2, 2010	Kitt Peak	Spacewatch	·	2.4 km	MPC · JPL
796824	2010 TB_{32}	—	September 14, 2010	Kitt Peak	Spacewatch	·	2.2 km	MPC · JPL
796825	2010 TF_{37}	—	October 5, 2010	Westfield	International Astronomical Search Collaboration	WIT	620 m	MPC · JPL
796826	2010 TL_{40}	—	September 11, 2010	Kitt Peak	Spacewatch	·	1.8 km	MPC · JPL
796827	2010 TV_{41}	—	October 2, 2010	Kitt Peak	Spacewatch	TIR	1.8 km	MPC · JPL
796828	2010 TA_{43}	—	November 15, 2006	Kitt Peak	Spacewatch	·	950 m	MPC · JPL
796829	2010 TN_{44}	—	October 3, 2010	Kitt Peak	Spacewatch	H	380 m	MPC · JPL
796830	2010 TR_{47}	—	October 8, 2010	Kitt Peak	Spacewatch	·	1.9 km	MPC · JPL
796831	2010 TX_{51}	—	October 8, 2010	Kitt Peak	Spacewatch	·	1.3 km	MPC · JPL
796832	2010 TC_{52}	—	October 8, 2010	Kitt Peak	Spacewatch	·	1.0 km	MPC · JPL
796833	2010 TA_{63}	—	October 1, 2010	Puebla de Don Fadrique	OAM	·	1.6 km	MPC · JPL
796834	2010 TB_{64}	—	September 15, 2010	Kitt Peak	Spacewatch	TIR	1.6 km	MPC · JPL
796835	2010 TH_{67}	—	September 18, 2010	Kitt Peak	Spacewatch	·	1.9 km	MPC · JPL
796836	2010 TZ_{67}	—	October 8, 2010	Kitt Peak	Spacewatch	·	1.5 km	MPC · JPL
796837	2010 TH_{69}	—	September 18, 2010	Kitt Peak	Spacewatch	·	1.9 km	MPC · JPL
796838	2010 TP_{69}	—	September 28, 2010	Kitt Peak	Spacewatch	·	2.1 km	MPC · JPL
796839	2010 TQ_{71}	—	October 8, 2010	Kitt Peak	Spacewatch	JUN	520 m	MPC · JPL
796840	2010 TO_{72}	—	September 9, 2010	Kitt Peak	Spacewatch	·	1.0 km	MPC · JPL
796841	2010 TL_{76}	—	October 8, 2010	Catalina	CSS	H	390 m	MPC · JPL
796842	2010 TV_{86}	—	October 9, 2010	Kitt Peak	Spacewatch	·	600 m	MPC · JPL
796843	2010 TQ_{88}	—	October 9, 2010	Mount Lemmon	Mount Lemmon Survey	·	1.8 km	MPC · JPL
796844	2010 TL_{90}	—	October 9, 2010	Mount Lemmon	Mount Lemmon Survey	·	1.2 km	MPC · JPL
796845	2010 TJ_{93}	—	October 1, 2010	Mount Lemmon	Mount Lemmon Survey	·	1.4 km	MPC · JPL
796846	2010 TF_{100}	—	September 17, 2010	Kitt Peak	Spacewatch	EUN	710 m	MPC · JPL
796847	2010 TX_{101}	—	September 30, 2010	Mount Lemmon	Mount Lemmon Survey	·	1.2 km	MPC · JPL
796848	2010 TU_{110}	—	September 16, 2010	Kitt Peak	Spacewatch	·	1.1 km	MPC · JPL
796849	2010 TJ_{127}	—	October 10, 2010	Mount Lemmon	Mount Lemmon Survey	·	2.2 km	MPC · JPL
796850	2010 TF_{136}	—	October 11, 2010	Mount Lemmon	Mount Lemmon Survey	·	1.8 km	MPC · JPL
796851	2010 TW_{137}	—	October 11, 2010	Mount Lemmon	Mount Lemmon Survey	MAR	660 m	MPC · JPL
796852	2010 TF_{140}	—	October 11, 2010	Mount Lemmon	Mount Lemmon Survey	HYG	1.9 km	MPC · JPL
796853	2010 TW_{147}	—	October 11, 2010	Mount Lemmon	Mount Lemmon Survey	·	1.2 km	MPC · JPL
796854	2010 TP_{156}	—	March 27, 2009	Catalina	CSS	H	470 m	MPC · JPL
796855	2010 TL_{162}	—	October 18, 2006	Kitt Peak	Spacewatch	·	940 m	MPC · JPL
796856	2010 TQ_{164}	—	November 25, 2005	Mount Lemmon	Mount Lemmon Survey	·	2.0 km	MPC · JPL
796857	2010 TG_{165}	—	September 18, 2010	Mount Lemmon	Mount Lemmon Survey	V	440 m	MPC · JPL
796858	2010 TO_{170}	—	October 25, 2003	Kitt Peak	Spacewatch	·	680 m	MPC · JPL
796859	2010 TJ_{176}	—	September 29, 2010	Mount Lemmon	Mount Lemmon Survey	H	440 m	MPC · JPL
796860	2010 TM_{185}	—	October 16, 2003	Kitt Peak	Spacewatch	·	670 m	MPC · JPL
796861	2010 TG_{198}	—	October 11, 2010	Mayhill-ISON	L. Elenin	·	900 m	MPC · JPL
796862	2010 TZ_{198}	—	October 13, 2010	Mount Lemmon	Mount Lemmon Survey	·	670 m	MPC · JPL
796863	2010 TY_{199}	—	October 1, 2010	Kitt Peak	Spacewatch	·	1.0 km	MPC · JPL
796864	2010 TB_{201}	—	October 9, 2010	Mount Lemmon	Mount Lemmon Survey	·	1.4 km	MPC · JPL
796865	2010 TC_{201}	—	October 2, 2010	Mount Lemmon	Mount Lemmon Survey	·	2.7 km	MPC · JPL
796866	2010 TF_{201}	—	October 9, 2010	Mount Lemmon	Mount Lemmon Survey	·	1.2 km	MPC · JPL
796867	2010 TR_{202}	—	October 13, 2010	Kitt Peak	Spacewatch	·	2.6 km	MPC · JPL
796868	2010 TV_{209}	—	October 8, 2015	Haleakala	Pan-STARRS 1	·	1.4 km	MPC · JPL
796869	2010 TF_{210}	—	March 6, 2013	Haleakala	Pan-STARRS 1	·	2.1 km	MPC · JPL
796870	2010 TE_{214}	—	October 10, 2010	Kitt Peak	Spacewatch	H	390 m	MPC · JPL
796871	2010 TC_{219}	—	October 3, 2010	Kitt Peak	Spacewatch	·	1.1 km	MPC · JPL
796872	2010 TJ_{220}	—	October 14, 2010	Mount Lemmon	Mount Lemmon Survey	·	1.4 km	MPC · JPL
796873	2010 TR_{220}	—	October 12, 2010	Kitt Peak	Spacewatch	·	1.3 km	MPC · JPL
796874	2010 TK_{223}	—	October 14, 2010	Mount Lemmon	Mount Lemmon Survey	·	1.3 km	MPC · JPL
796875	2010 TX_{223}	—	October 9, 2010	Kitt Peak	Spacewatch	·	2.1 km	MPC · JPL
796876	2010 TB_{224}	—	October 1, 2010	Mount Lemmon	Mount Lemmon Survey	KOR	890 m	MPC · JPL
796877	2010 TT_{224}	—	October 12, 2010	Mount Lemmon	Mount Lemmon Survey	·	2.7 km	MPC · JPL
796878	2010 TB_{225}	—	October 14, 2010	Mount Lemmon	Mount Lemmon Survey	·	2.2 km	MPC · JPL
796879	2010 TE_{225}	—	October 13, 2010	Mount Lemmon	Mount Lemmon Survey	·	2.6 km	MPC · JPL
796880	2010 TW_{227}	—	October 1, 2010	Kitt Peak	Spacewatch	·	1.8 km	MPC · JPL
796881	2010 TJ_{228}	—	October 10, 2010	Mount Lemmon	Mount Lemmon Survey	URS	1.8 km	MPC · JPL
796882	2010 TW_{228}	—	October 1, 2010	Mount Lemmon	Mount Lemmon Survey	·	2.0 km	MPC · JPL
796883	2010 TC_{229}	—	October 2, 2010	Mount Lemmon	Mount Lemmon Survey	·	2.0 km	MPC · JPL
796884	2010 TG_{231}	—	October 8, 2010	Kitt Peak	Spacewatch	EOS	1.3 km	MPC · JPL
796885	2010 TV_{231}	—	October 13, 2010	Mount Lemmon	Mount Lemmon Survey	TIR	2.1 km	MPC · JPL
796886	2010 TY_{231}	—	October 13, 2010	Mount Lemmon	Mount Lemmon Survey	·	2.0 km	MPC · JPL
796887	2010 TM_{233}	—	October 12, 2010	Mount Lemmon	Mount Lemmon Survey	EUN	780 m	MPC · JPL
796888	2010 TN_{233}	—	October 1, 2010	Kitt Peak	Spacewatch	·	2.1 km	MPC · JPL
796889	2010 TQ_{235}	—	October 9, 2010	Kitt Peak	Spacewatch	·	1.3 km	MPC · JPL
796890	2010 TQ_{237}	—	October 2, 2010	Mount Lemmon	Mount Lemmon Survey	L4	5.7 km	MPC · JPL
796891	2010 TV_{237}	—	October 14, 2010	Mount Lemmon	Mount Lemmon Survey	(5)	920 m	MPC · JPL
796892	2010 TF_{238}	—	October 9, 2010	Mount Lemmon	Mount Lemmon Survey	·	1.0 km	MPC · JPL
796893	2010 TO_{240}	—	June 16, 2018	Haleakala	Pan-STARRS 1	HNS	760 m	MPC · JPL
796894	2010 TL_{242}	—	October 9, 2010	Mount Lemmon	Mount Lemmon Survey	·	1.4 km	MPC · JPL
796895	2010 UJ_{14}	—	October 14, 2010	Mount Lemmon	Mount Lemmon Survey	MAR	690 m	MPC · JPL
796896	2010 UN_{32}	—	October 11, 2010	Mount Lemmon	Mount Lemmon Survey	VER	2.0 km	MPC · JPL
796897	2010 UU_{34}	—	October 29, 2010	Mount Lemmon	Mount Lemmon Survey	(5)	760 m	MPC · JPL
796898	2010 UK_{40}	—	October 29, 2010	Piszkés-tető	K. Sárneczky, S. Kürti	VER	2.1 km	MPC · JPL
796899	2010 UL_{49}	—	October 12, 2010	Mount Lemmon	Mount Lemmon Survey	EUN	930 m	MPC · JPL
796900	2010 UV_{67}	—	October 11, 2010	Mount Lemmon	Mount Lemmon Survey	·	860 m	MPC · JPL

== 796901–797000 ==
back to top

Designation			Discovery			Properties		Ref
Permanent	Provisional	Named after	Date	Site	Discoverer(s)	Category	Diam.	Ref
796901	2010 UA_{68}	—	October 10, 2010	Kitt Peak	Spacewatch	·	1.0 km	MPC · JPL
796902	2010 UW_{68}	—	October 31, 2010	Piszkés-tető	K. Sárneczky, Z. Kuli	·	1.2 km	MPC · JPL
796903	2010 UD_{69}	—	October 31, 2010	Piszkés-tető	K. Sárneczky, Z. Kuli	·	1.0 km	MPC · JPL
796904	2010 US_{84}	—	October 9, 2010	Mount Lemmon	Mount Lemmon Survey	·	1.1 km	MPC · JPL
796905	2010 UL_{85}	—	October 30, 2010	Mount Lemmon	Mount Lemmon Survey	·	1.8 km	MPC · JPL
796906	2010 UL_{87}	—	October 30, 2010	Mount Lemmon	Mount Lemmon Survey	·	1.3 km	MPC · JPL
796907	2010 UQ_{98}	—	October 13, 2010	Mount Lemmon	Mount Lemmon Survey	·	1.1 km	MPC · JPL
796908	2010 UC_{103}	—	November 3, 2010	Mount Lemmon	Mount Lemmon Survey	·	1.2 km	MPC · JPL
796909	2010 UB_{106}	—	November 3, 2010	Mount Lemmon	Mount Lemmon Survey	KOR	1.0 km	MPC · JPL
796910	2010 UY_{109}	—	October 31, 2010	Mount Lemmon	Mount Lemmon Survey	·	2.5 km	MPC · JPL
796911	2010 UZ_{111}	—	October 17, 2010	Mount Lemmon	Mount Lemmon Survey	·	1.1 km	MPC · JPL
796912	2010 UY_{112}	—	October 29, 2010	Kitt Peak	Spacewatch	·	1.0 km	MPC · JPL
796913	2010 UD_{116}	—	August 28, 2014	Haleakala	Pan-STARRS 1	·	990 m	MPC · JPL
796914	2010 UT_{118}	—	July 28, 2014	Haleakala	Pan-STARRS 1	·	1.3 km	MPC · JPL
796915	2010 UD_{120}	—	October 29, 2010	Mount Lemmon	Mount Lemmon Survey	·	1.1 km	MPC · JPL
796916	2010 UE_{120}	—	October 17, 2010	Mount Lemmon	Mount Lemmon Survey	·	1.2 km	MPC · JPL
796917	2010 UH_{121}	—	October 17, 2010	Mount Lemmon	Mount Lemmon Survey	HNS	800 m	MPC · JPL
796918	2010 UL_{122}	—	October 28, 2010	Mount Lemmon	Mount Lemmon Survey	·	660 m	MPC · JPL
796919	2010 UN_{122}	—	October 30, 2010	Kitt Peak	Spacewatch	·	660 m	MPC · JPL
796920	2010 UA_{123}	—	October 17, 2010	Mount Lemmon	Mount Lemmon Survey	KOR	1.0 km	MPC · JPL
796921	2010 UY_{123}	—	October 17, 2010	Mount Lemmon	Mount Lemmon Survey	·	490 m	MPC · JPL
796922	2010 UD_{124}	—	October 31, 2010	Mount Lemmon	Mount Lemmon Survey	·	2.1 km	MPC · JPL
796923	2010 UB_{125}	—	October 17, 2010	Mount Lemmon	Mount Lemmon Survey	KOR	1.3 km	MPC · JPL
796924	2010 UZ_{125}	—	October 30, 2010	Mount Lemmon	Mount Lemmon Survey	·	1.4 km	MPC · JPL
796925	2010 UV_{126}	—	October 30, 2010	Mount Lemmon	Mount Lemmon Survey	·	2.1 km	MPC · JPL
796926	2010 UH_{129}	—	October 17, 2010	Mount Lemmon	Mount Lemmon Survey	·	1.9 km	MPC · JPL
796927	2010 UY_{129}	—	October 17, 2010	Mount Lemmon	Mount Lemmon Survey	·	2.4 km	MPC · JPL
796928	2010 UL_{130}	—	October 17, 2010	Mount Lemmon	Mount Lemmon Survey	·	1.0 km	MPC · JPL
796929	2010 UN_{130}	—	October 28, 2010	Mount Lemmon	Mount Lemmon Survey	·	1.2 km	MPC · JPL
796930	2010 US_{130}	—	October 30, 2010	Mount Lemmon	Mount Lemmon Survey	·	2.2 km	MPC · JPL
796931	2010 UH_{132}	—	October 19, 2010	Mount Lemmon	Mount Lemmon Survey	TIR	2.2 km	MPC · JPL
796932	2010 UO_{133}	—	October 17, 2010	Mount Lemmon	Mount Lemmon Survey	THM	1.4 km	MPC · JPL
796933	2010 US_{133}	—	October 28, 2010	Mount Lemmon	Mount Lemmon Survey	·	1.7 km	MPC · JPL
796934	2010 UJ_{134}	—	October 17, 2010	Mount Lemmon	Mount Lemmon Survey	·	1.0 km	MPC · JPL
796935	2010 UP_{134}	—	October 17, 2010	Mount Lemmon	Mount Lemmon Survey	·	1.9 km	MPC · JPL
796936	2010 UQ_{135}	—	October 17, 2010	Mount Lemmon	Mount Lemmon Survey	·	1.8 km	MPC · JPL
796937	2010 UR_{136}	—	October 31, 2010	Mount Lemmon	Mount Lemmon Survey	·	510 m	MPC · JPL
796938	2010 UD_{139}	—	October 17, 2010	Mount Lemmon	Mount Lemmon Survey	·	3.1 km	MPC · JPL
796939	2010 VF_{9}	—	November 1, 2010	Mount Lemmon	Mount Lemmon Survey	·	560 m	MPC · JPL
796940	2010 VF_{10}	—	November 1, 2010	Catalina	CSS	·	640 m	MPC · JPL
796941	2010 VH_{13}	—	November 1, 2010	Mount Lemmon	Mount Lemmon Survey	·	1.2 km	MPC · JPL
796942	2010 VD_{22}	—	October 7, 2010	Catalina	CSS	·	1.3 km	MPC · JPL
796943	2010 VK_{23}	—	October 12, 2010	Mount Lemmon	Mount Lemmon Survey	AEO	620 m	MPC · JPL
796944	2010 VV_{24}	—	November 1, 2010	Kitt Peak	Spacewatch	HOF	2.0 km	MPC · JPL
796945	2010 VK_{28}	—	October 19, 2006	Catalina	CSS	·	1.3 km	MPC · JPL
796946	2010 VP_{40}	—	October 11, 2010	Mount Lemmon	Mount Lemmon Survey	·	1.1 km	MPC · JPL
796947	2010 VQ_{40}	—	September 15, 2010	Les Engarouines	L. Bernasconi	·	500 m	MPC · JPL
796948	2010 VY_{49}	—	November 3, 2010	Kitt Peak	Spacewatch	·	1.2 km	MPC · JPL
796949	2010 VB_{50}	—	October 19, 2010	Mount Lemmon	Mount Lemmon Survey	H	480 m	MPC · JPL
796950	2010 VW_{52}	—	November 3, 2010	Mount Lemmon	Mount Lemmon Survey	·	1.4 km	MPC · JPL
796951	2010 VP_{64}	—	November 6, 2010	Mount Lemmon	Mount Lemmon Survey	·	1.0 km	MPC · JPL
796952	2010 VP_{72}	—	October 2, 2010	Mount Lemmon	Mount Lemmon Survey	·	1.3 km	MPC · JPL
796953	2010 VH_{75}	—	October 12, 2010	Mount Lemmon	Mount Lemmon Survey	·	1.2 km	MPC · JPL
796954	2010 VL_{78}	—	September 11, 2010	Mount Lemmon	Mount Lemmon Survey	·	530 m	MPC · JPL
796955	2010 VQ_{79}	—	October 27, 2005	Mount Lemmon	Mount Lemmon Survey	KOR	990 m	MPC · JPL
796956	2010 VT_{87}	—	October 14, 2010	Mount Lemmon	Mount Lemmon Survey	·	2.5 km	MPC · JPL
796957	2010 VM_{90}	—	November 6, 2010	Kitt Peak	Spacewatch	·	1.2 km	MPC · JPL
796958	2010 VX_{92}	—	October 31, 2010	Mount Lemmon	Mount Lemmon Survey	·	1.1 km	MPC · JPL
796959	2010 VD_{95}	—	November 7, 2010	Mount Lemmon	Mount Lemmon Survey	·	1.4 km	MPC · JPL
796960	2010 VA_{96}	—	November 8, 2010	Mount Lemmon	Mount Lemmon Survey	·	670 m	MPC · JPL
796961	2010 VV_{108}	—	November 6, 2010	Mount Lemmon	Mount Lemmon Survey	EUN	1.2 km	MPC · JPL
796962	2010 VO_{109}	—	November 6, 2010	Mount Lemmon	Mount Lemmon Survey	·	1.1 km	MPC · JPL
796963	2010 VN_{112}	—	November 10, 1999	Kitt Peak	Spacewatch	·	2.4 km	MPC · JPL
796964	2010 VJ_{115}	—	November 7, 2010	Mount Lemmon	Mount Lemmon Survey	·	1.2 km	MPC · JPL
796965	2010 VH_{119}	—	November 8, 2010	Kitt Peak	Spacewatch	L4	5.6 km	MPC · JPL
796966	2010 VD_{120}	—	November 8, 2010	Kitt Peak	Spacewatch	·	1.5 km	MPC · JPL
796967	2010 VL_{120}	—	November 8, 2010	Kitt Peak	Spacewatch	JUN	780 m	MPC · JPL
796968	2010 VT_{125}	—	November 8, 2010	Kitt Peak	Spacewatch	MIS	1.7 km	MPC · JPL
796969	2010 VZ_{131}	—	November 1, 2010	Mount Lemmon	Mount Lemmon Survey	·	1.1 km	MPC · JPL
796970	2010 VB_{132}	—	October 17, 2010	Mount Lemmon	Mount Lemmon Survey	·	2.3 km	MPC · JPL
796971	2010 VY_{133}	—	October 9, 2010	Mount Lemmon	Mount Lemmon Survey	·	1.0 km	MPC · JPL
796972	2010 VJ_{134}	—	October 30, 2010	Piszkés-tető	K. Sárneczky, Z. Kuli	·	1.2 km	MPC · JPL
796973	2010 VA_{139}	—	October 15, 2010	Sandlot	G. Hug	·	2.7 km	MPC · JPL
796974	2010 VO_{143}	—	November 6, 2010	Mount Lemmon	Mount Lemmon Survey	·	1.2 km	MPC · JPL
796975	2010 VR_{148}	—	November 6, 2010	Mount Lemmon	Mount Lemmon Survey	(1298)	2.1 km	MPC · JPL
796976	2010 VF_{154}	—	November 7, 2010	Mount Lemmon	Mount Lemmon Survey	·	1.3 km	MPC · JPL
796977	2010 VV_{156}	—	November 8, 2010	Kitt Peak	Spacewatch	HNS	870 m	MPC · JPL
796978	2010 VM_{158}	—	November 8, 2010	Mauna Kea	Forshay, P., M. Micheli	·	820 m	MPC · JPL
796979	2010 VC_{175}	—	November 19, 2003	Kitt Peak	Spacewatch	·	550 m	MPC · JPL
796980	2010 VK_{175}	—	November 11, 2010	Kitt Peak	Spacewatch	·	2.2 km	MPC · JPL
796981	2010 VK_{182}	—	November 1, 2010	Bisei	BATTeRS	·	1.0 km	MPC · JPL
796982	2010 VV_{189}	—	November 13, 2010	Mount Lemmon	Mount Lemmon Survey	KOR	1.1 km	MPC · JPL
796983	2010 VK_{190}	—	November 13, 2010	Mount Lemmon	Mount Lemmon Survey	L4	5.6 km	MPC · JPL
796984	2010 VD_{194}	—	November 13, 2010	Mount Lemmon	Mount Lemmon Survey	·	540 m	MPC · JPL
796985	2010 VP_{197}	—	November 14, 2010	Mount Lemmon	Mount Lemmon Survey	LIX	2.1 km	MPC · JPL
796986	2010 VW_{215}	—	October 30, 2010	Mount Lemmon	Mount Lemmon Survey	·	1.1 km	MPC · JPL
796987	2010 VB_{218}	—	April 1, 2008	Kitt Peak	Spacewatch	(194)	1.4 km	MPC · JPL
796988	2010 VX_{219}	—	November 2, 2010	Kitt Peak	Spacewatch	·	910 m	MPC · JPL
796989	2010 VF_{231}	—	November 2, 2010	Mount Lemmon	Mount Lemmon Survey	·	590 m	MPC · JPL
796990	2010 VZ_{233}	—	February 23, 2012	Kitt Peak	Spacewatch	·	540 m	MPC · JPL
796991	2010 VM_{234}	—	November 10, 2010	Mount Lemmon	Mount Lemmon Survey	TIR	2.1 km	MPC · JPL
796992	2010 VZ_{234}	—	November 8, 2010	Mount Lemmon	Mount Lemmon Survey	·	1.0 km	MPC · JPL
796993	2010 VW_{235}	—	November 13, 2010	Mount Lemmon	Mount Lemmon Survey	·	2.7 km	MPC · JPL
796994	2010 VP_{236}	—	November 13, 2010	Mount Lemmon	Mount Lemmon Survey	THB	2.5 km	MPC · JPL
796995	2010 VC_{237}	—	November 8, 2010	Mount Lemmon	Mount Lemmon Survey	LIX	2.2 km	MPC · JPL
796996	2010 VC_{240}	—	November 1, 2010	Mount Lemmon	Mount Lemmon Survey	3:2	3.7 km	MPC · JPL
796997	2010 VC_{245}	—	November 3, 2010	Mount Lemmon	Mount Lemmon Survey	·	2.3 km	MPC · JPL
796998	2010 VR_{245}	—	November 3, 2010	Mount Lemmon	Mount Lemmon Survey	·	1.5 km	MPC · JPL
796999	2010 VW_{247}	—	November 12, 2010	Mount Lemmon	Mount Lemmon Survey	EOS	1.3 km	MPC · JPL
797000	2010 VJ_{248}	—	November 10, 2010	Kitt Peak	Spacewatch	KOR	980 m	MPC · JPL

back to top
