= List of minor planets: 647001–648000 =

The following is a partial list of minor planets, running from minor-planet number 647001 through 648000, inclusive. The primary data for this and other partial lists is based on JPL's "Small-Body Orbital Elements" and data available from the Minor Planet Center. Critical list information is also provided by the MPC, unless otherwise specified from Lowell Observatory. A detailed description of the table's columns and additional sources are given on the main page including a complete list of every page in this series, and a statistical break-up on the dynamical classification of minor planets.

Also see the summary list of all named bodies in numerical and alphabetical order, and the corresponding naming citations for the number range of this particular list. New namings may only be added to this list after official publication, as the preannouncement of names is condemned by the Working Group for Small Bodies Nomenclature of the International Astronomical Union.

Near-Earth obj.	MBA (inner)	MBA (outer)	Centaur
Mars-crosser	MBA (middle)	Jupiter trojan	Trans-Neptunian obj.
Unclassified

== 647001–647100 ==
Designation			Discovery			Properties		Ref
Permanent	Provisional	Named after	Date	Site	Discoverer(s)	Category	Diam.	Ref
647001	2008 JP_{47}	—	April 23, 2014	Cerro Tololo	DECam	·	2.2 km	MPC · JPL
647002	2008 JU_{47}	—	January 14, 2016	Haleakala	Pan-STARRS 1	·	2.0 km	MPC · JPL
647003	2008 JO_{48}	—	March 13, 2013	Palomar	Palomar Transient Factory	·	2.6 km	MPC · JPL
647004	2008 JG_{54}	—	May 14, 2008	Mount Lemmon	Mount Lemmon Survey	·	490 m	MPC · JPL
647005	2008 JO_{54}	—	May 3, 2008	Mount Lemmon	Mount Lemmon Survey	·	1.2 km	MPC · JPL
647006	2008 KT_{2}	—	May 27, 2008	Kitt Peak	Spacewatch	VER	2.6 km	MPC · JPL
647007	2008 KP_{6}	—	May 5, 2008	Mount Lemmon	Mount Lemmon Survey	·	1.5 km	MPC · JPL
647008	2008 KQ_{6}	—	May 3, 2008	Mount Lemmon	Mount Lemmon Survey	H	390 m	MPC · JPL
647009	2008 KF_{8}	—	April 29, 2008	Kitt Peak	Spacewatch	·	1.2 km	MPC · JPL
647010	2008 KV_{12}	—	May 27, 2008	Kitt Peak	Spacewatch	·	930 m	MPC · JPL
647011	2008 KC_{13}	—	April 8, 2008	Kitt Peak	Spacewatch	(3025)	3.2 km	MPC · JPL
647012	2008 KL_{19}	—	March 23, 2003	Apache Point	SDSS Collaboration	·	1.7 km	MPC · JPL
647013	2008 KV_{21}	—	May 28, 2008	Mount Lemmon	Mount Lemmon Survey	·	520 m	MPC · JPL
647014	2008 KO_{22}	—	May 28, 2008	Kitt Peak	Spacewatch	·	1.1 km	MPC · JPL
647015	2008 KX_{23}	—	April 13, 2008	Mount Lemmon	Mount Lemmon Survey	·	3.1 km	MPC · JPL
647016	2008 KM_{24}	—	May 28, 2008	Kitt Peak	Spacewatch	·	1.8 km	MPC · JPL
647017	2008 KX_{26}	—	May 29, 2008	Kitt Peak	Spacewatch	·	1.6 km	MPC · JPL
647018	2008 KO_{27}	—	April 28, 2008	Mount Lemmon	Mount Lemmon Survey	·	580 m	MPC · JPL
647019	2008 KV_{29}	—	May 29, 2008	Kitt Peak	Spacewatch	·	1.1 km	MPC · JPL
647020	2008 KD_{30}	—	May 29, 2008	Kitt Peak	Spacewatch	·	1.7 km	MPC · JPL
647021	2008 KQ_{32}	—	May 15, 2008	Kitt Peak	Spacewatch	·	1.6 km	MPC · JPL
647022	2008 KK_{34}	—	April 28, 2008	Kitt Peak	Spacewatch	·	2.5 km	MPC · JPL
647023	2008 KK_{36}	—	May 29, 2008	Mount Lemmon	Mount Lemmon Survey	·	1.6 km	MPC · JPL
647024	2008 KL_{37}	—	July 21, 2004	Siding Spring	SSS	ADE	1.8 km	MPC · JPL
647025	2008 KW_{41}	—	March 27, 2008	Mount Lemmon	Mount Lemmon Survey	·	2.9 km	MPC · JPL
647026	2008 KP_{42}	—	May 31, 2008	Mount Lemmon	Mount Lemmon Survey	·	1.3 km	MPC · JPL
647027	2008 KT_{43}	—	September 15, 2009	Kitt Peak	Spacewatch	·	2.8 km	MPC · JPL
647028	2008 KJ_{44}	—	May 6, 2016	Haleakala	Pan-STARRS 1	·	1.1 km	MPC · JPL
647029	2008 KN_{45}	—	April 17, 2015	Mount Lemmon	Mount Lemmon Survey	·	510 m	MPC · JPL
647030	2008 KQ_{45}	—	August 17, 2009	Kitt Peak	Spacewatch	·	1.5 km	MPC · JPL
647031	2008 KU_{45}	—	December 24, 2014	Mount Lemmon	Mount Lemmon Survey	EUN	1 km	MPC · JPL
647032	2008 KA_{46}	—	November 17, 2014	Mount Lemmon	Mount Lemmon Survey	·	1.3 km	MPC · JPL
647033	2008 KD_{46}	—	January 13, 2018	Mount Lemmon	Mount Lemmon Survey	·	3.0 km	MPC · JPL
647034	2008 KF_{46}	—	September 5, 2010	Mount Lemmon	Mount Lemmon Survey	·	2.6 km	MPC · JPL
647035	2008 KN_{47}	—	May 18, 2015	Haleakala	Pan-STARRS 1	·	600 m	MPC · JPL
647036	2008 KE_{48}	—	September 29, 2010	Mount Lemmon	Mount Lemmon Survey	VER	2.2 km	MPC · JPL
647037	2008 LU_{1}	—	June 2, 2008	Mount Lemmon	Mount Lemmon Survey	·	1.0 km	MPC · JPL
647038	2008 LU_{3}	—	June 2, 2008	Mount Lemmon	Mount Lemmon Survey	·	3.1 km	MPC · JPL
647039	2008 LO_{6}	—	June 3, 2008	Kitt Peak	Spacewatch	·	1.8 km	MPC · JPL
647040	2008 LH_{14}	—	June 7, 2008	Kitt Peak	Spacewatch	ADE	2.3 km	MPC · JPL
647041	2008 LL_{16}	—	May 14, 2008	Kitt Peak	Spacewatch	PHO	860 m	MPC · JPL
647042	2008 LP_{19}	—	November 21, 2017	Haleakala	Pan-STARRS 1	LUT	3.4 km	MPC · JPL
647043	2008 LU_{19}	—	April 2, 2011	Mount Lemmon	Mount Lemmon Survey	·	480 m	MPC · JPL
647044	2008 LN_{20}	—	October 24, 2011	Haleakala	Pan-STARRS 1	EUP	2.7 km	MPC · JPL
647045	2008 LX_{20}	—	October 17, 2012	Mount Lemmon	Mount Lemmon Survey	·	700 m	MPC · JPL
647046	2008 MP_{5}	—	June 30, 2008	Kitt Peak	Spacewatch	·	720 m	MPC · JPL
647047	2008 NB_{1}	—	February 9, 2007	Catalina	CSS	·	2.0 km	MPC · JPL
647048	2008 NR_{3}	—	July 14, 2008	Charleston	R. Holmes	(18466)	1.8 km	MPC · JPL
647049	2008 NP_{5}	—	November 25, 2013	Haleakala	Pan-STARRS 1	PHO	1.1 km	MPC · JPL
647050	2008 NQ_{5}	—	May 9, 2011	Mount Lemmon	Mount Lemmon Survey	·	600 m	MPC · JPL
647051	2008 NB_{6}	—	December 28, 2014	Mount Lemmon	Mount Lemmon Survey	·	1.7 km	MPC · JPL
647052	2008 NJ_{6}	—	July 11, 2008	Siding Spring	SSS	·	1.7 km	MPC · JPL
647053	2008 OD_{6}	—	July 30, 2008	Catalina	CSS	·	750 m	MPC · JPL
647054	2008 OE_{7}	—	July 2, 2008	Kitt Peak	Spacewatch	·	2.0 km	MPC · JPL
647055	2008 OQ_{11}	—	July 31, 2008	La Sagra	OAM	·	830 m	MPC · JPL
647056	2008 OX_{11}	—	January 28, 2007	Kitt Peak	Spacewatch	·	1.2 km	MPC · JPL
647057	2008 ON_{19}	—	July 29, 2008	Kitt Peak	Spacewatch	·	1.1 km	MPC · JPL
647058	2008 OY_{22}	—	January 22, 2015	Haleakala	Pan-STARRS 1	·	1.6 km	MPC · JPL
647059	2008 OK_{23}	—	July 28, 2008	Siding Spring	SSS	·	1.3 km	MPC · JPL
647060	2008 OF_{26}	—	February 10, 2011	Mount Lemmon	Mount Lemmon Survey	·	1.8 km	MPC · JPL
647061	2008 OR_{26}	—	September 14, 2013	Mount Lemmon	Mount Lemmon Survey	·	1.2 km	MPC · JPL
647062	2008 OE_{29}	—	November 9, 2013	Catalina	CSS	·	1.8 km	MPC · JPL
647063	2008 OA_{30}	—	May 26, 2015	Haleakala	Pan-STARRS 1	·	910 m	MPC · JPL
647064	2008 OE_{31}	—	July 29, 2008	Mount Lemmon	Mount Lemmon Survey	WIT	710 m	MPC · JPL
647065	2008 OC_{32}	—	July 29, 2008	Kitt Peak	Spacewatch	·	480 m	MPC · JPL
647066	2008 OK_{32}	—	July 29, 2008	Kitt Peak	Spacewatch	·	1.6 km	MPC · JPL
647067	2008 OW_{32}	—	July 29, 2008	Kitt Peak	Spacewatch	L4	7.9 km	MPC · JPL
647068	2008 OY_{32}	—	July 30, 2008	Mount Lemmon	Mount Lemmon Survey	L4	6.7 km	MPC · JPL
647069	2008 PY_{1}	—	August 3, 2008	La Sagra	OAM	·	840 m	MPC · JPL
647070	2008 PS_{2}	—	July 30, 2008	Catalina	CSS	·	1.0 km	MPC · JPL
647071	2008 PU_{2}	—	August 4, 2008	Siding Spring	SSS	·	2.8 km	MPC · JPL
647072	2008 PZ_{2}	—	August 3, 2008	Dauban	F. Kugel, C. Rinner	·	640 m	MPC · JPL
647073	2008 PJ_{4}	—	August 5, 2008	Hibiscus	Teamo, N., S. F. Hönig	MAR	1.2 km	MPC · JPL
647074	2008 PB_{9}	—	May 30, 2008	Kitt Peak	Spacewatch	·	2.1 km	MPC · JPL
647075	2008 PU_{17}	—	August 11, 2008	Dauban	F. Kugel, C. Rinner	·	680 m	MPC · JPL
647076	2008 PW_{18}	—	August 6, 2008	Eygalayes	Sogorb, P.	·	1.3 km	MPC · JPL
647077	2008 PL_{20}	—	August 7, 2008	Kitt Peak	Spacewatch	MAS	650 m	MPC · JPL
647078	2008 PA_{23}	—	August 6, 2008	Siding Spring	SSS	TIN	870 m	MPC · JPL
647079	2008 PE_{23}	—	March 5, 2016	Haleakala	Pan-STARRS 1	·	1.8 km	MPC · JPL
647080	2008 PT_{24}	—	August 7, 2008	Kitt Peak	Spacewatch	·	910 m	MPC · JPL
647081	2008 PW_{24}	—	August 7, 2008	Kitt Peak	Spacewatch	·	1.4 km	MPC · JPL
647082	2008 QK_{4}	—	August 20, 2008	Kitt Peak	Spacewatch	·	2.0 km	MPC · JPL
647083	2008 QN_{6}	—	August 25, 2008	Dauban	F. Kugel, C. Rinner	·	2.1 km	MPC · JPL
647084	2008 QF_{12}	—	August 21, 2008	Kitt Peak	Spacewatch	NYS	890 m	MPC · JPL
647085	2008 QS_{13}	—	August 21, 2008	Kitt Peak	Spacewatch	·	810 m	MPC · JPL
647086	2008 QF_{21}	—	August 25, 2008	Črni Vrh	Matičič, S.	·	1.2 km	MPC · JPL
647087	2008 QU_{26}	—	August 30, 2008	La Sagra	OAM	NYS	910 m	MPC · JPL
647088	2008 QN_{29}	—	August 20, 2008	Kitt Peak	Spacewatch	·	1.1 km	MPC · JPL
647089	2008 QG_{30}	—	August 25, 2008	Črni Vrh	Matičič, S.	·	1.7 km	MPC · JPL
647090	2008 QQ_{31}	—	August 30, 2008	Socorro	LINEAR	·	930 m	MPC · JPL
647091	2008 QV_{31}	—	July 29, 2008	Mount Lemmon	Mount Lemmon Survey	·	2.0 km	MPC · JPL
647092	2008 QG_{35}	—	August 31, 2008	Moletai	K. Černis, Zdanavicius, J.	·	850 m	MPC · JPL
647093	2008 QD_{40}	—	August 27, 2008	La Sagra	OAM	·	920 m	MPC · JPL
647094	2008 QN_{44}	—	September 5, 2008	Kitt Peak	Spacewatch	·	1.8 km	MPC · JPL
647095	2008 QF_{46}	—	August 21, 2008	Kitt Peak	Spacewatch	·	890 m	MPC · JPL
647096	2008 QL_{48}	—	August 23, 2008	Socorro	LINEAR	·	1.3 km	MPC · JPL
647097	2008 QD_{49}	—	February 12, 2015	Haleakala	Pan-STARRS 1	·	1.5 km	MPC · JPL
647098	2008 QE_{49}	—	March 7, 2016	Haleakala	Pan-STARRS 1	(1547)	1.5 km	MPC · JPL
647099	2008 QP_{49}	—	November 30, 2016	Mount Lemmon	Mount Lemmon Survey	·	1.2 km	MPC · JPL
647100	2008 QJ_{50}	—	November 4, 2013	Haleakala	Pan-STARRS 1	·	1.6 km	MPC · JPL

== 647101–647200 ==
back to top

Designation			Discovery			Properties		Ref
Permanent	Provisional	Named after	Date	Site	Discoverer(s)	Category	Diam.	Ref
647101	2008 QX_{50}	—	August 21, 2008	Kitt Peak	Spacewatch	·	1.2 km	MPC · JPL
647102	2008 QO_{51}	—	August 24, 2008	Kitt Peak	Spacewatch	L4	6.0 km	MPC · JPL
647103	2008 RX	—	September 1, 2008	La Sagra	OAM	DOR	2.0 km	MPC · JPL
647104	2008 RE_{8}	—	September 3, 2008	Kitt Peak	Spacewatch	·	570 m	MPC · JPL
647105	2008 RR_{10}	—	September 3, 2008	Kitt Peak	Spacewatch	·	690 m	MPC · JPL
647106	2008 RD_{11}	—	August 23, 2008	Kitt Peak	Spacewatch	·	1.1 km	MPC · JPL
647107	2008 RP_{12}	—	September 3, 2008	Kitt Peak	Spacewatch	BRA	1.1 km	MPC · JPL
647108	2008 RZ_{19}	—	September 4, 2008	Kitt Peak	Spacewatch	·	900 m	MPC · JPL
647109	2008 RC_{22}	—	October 18, 2001	Palomar	NEAT	·	880 m	MPC · JPL
647110	2008 RY_{26}	—	September 7, 2008	Mount Lemmon	Mount Lemmon Survey	·	1.9 km	MPC · JPL
647111	2008 RA_{28}	—	August 8, 2008	La Sagra	OAM	·	720 m	MPC · JPL
647112	2008 RF_{28}	—	September 2, 2008	La Sagra	OAM	·	960 m	MPC · JPL
647113	2008 RS_{32}	—	September 2, 2008	Kitt Peak	Spacewatch	·	850 m	MPC · JPL
647114	2008 RF_{33}	—	September 2, 2008	Kitt Peak	Spacewatch	AGN	850 m	MPC · JPL
647115	2008 RG_{34}	—	March 13, 2007	Mount Lemmon	Mount Lemmon Survey	·	650 m	MPC · JPL
647116	2008 RN_{39}	—	September 2, 2008	Kitt Peak	Spacewatch	·	750 m	MPC · JPL
647117	2008 RK_{42}	—	September 2, 2008	Kitt Peak	Spacewatch	MAS	530 m	MPC · JPL
647118	2008 RV_{45}	—	September 2, 2008	Kitt Peak	Spacewatch	L4	5.9 km	MPC · JPL
647119	2008 RP_{47}	—	September 6, 2008	Catalina	CSS	NYS	910 m	MPC · JPL
647120	2008 RD_{48}	—	October 24, 2005	Mauna Kea	A. Boattini	·	2.0 km	MPC · JPL
647121	2008 RD_{54}	—	September 3, 2008	Kitt Peak	Spacewatch	·	550 m	MPC · JPL
647122	2008 RT_{54}	—	September 3, 2008	Kitt Peak	Spacewatch	GEF	1.3 km	MPC · JPL
647123	2008 RH_{55}	—	September 3, 2008	Kitt Peak	Spacewatch	·	1.1 km	MPC · JPL
647124	2008 RA_{56}	—	September 3, 2008	Kitt Peak	Spacewatch	MRX	840 m	MPC · JPL
647125	2008 RQ_{56}	—	September 3, 2008	Kitt Peak	Spacewatch	·	710 m	MPC · JPL
647126	2008 RS_{56}	—	September 3, 2008	Kitt Peak	Spacewatch	NYS	1.0 km	MPC · JPL
647127	2008 RA_{57}	—	September 3, 2008	Kitt Peak	Spacewatch	L4	6.4 km	MPC · JPL
647128	2008 RM_{57}	—	September 3, 2008	Kitt Peak	Spacewatch	HOF	1.9 km	MPC · JPL
647129	2008 RR_{59}	—	September 4, 2008	Kitt Peak	Spacewatch	·	1.4 km	MPC · JPL
647130	2008 RL_{60}	—	September 4, 2008	Kitt Peak	Spacewatch	·	1.3 km	MPC · JPL
647131	2008 RM_{61}	—	September 4, 2008	Kitt Peak	Spacewatch	·	1.5 km	MPC · JPL
647132	2008 RH_{72}	—	October 17, 2001	Kitt Peak	Spacewatch	MAS	580 m	MPC · JPL
647133	2008 RN_{73}	—	November 18, 2001	Kitt Peak	Spacewatch	NYS	1.1 km	MPC · JPL
647134	2008 RG_{83}	—	September 4, 2008	Kitt Peak	Spacewatch	L4	6.5 km	MPC · JPL
647135	2008 RK_{84}	—	September 4, 2008	Kitt Peak	Spacewatch	·	1.5 km	MPC · JPL
647136	2008 RO_{84}	—	July 29, 2008	Kitt Peak	Spacewatch	·	550 m	MPC · JPL
647137	2008 RS_{84}	—	September 4, 2008	Kitt Peak	Spacewatch	NYS	1.0 km	MPC · JPL
647138	2008 RB_{87}	—	September 5, 2008	Kitt Peak	Spacewatch	·	1.1 km	MPC · JPL
647139	2008 RN_{88}	—	September 5, 2008	Kitt Peak	Spacewatch	·	960 m	MPC · JPL
647140	2008 RG_{89}	—	September 5, 2008	Kitt Peak	Spacewatch	·	970 m	MPC · JPL
647141	2008 RZ_{90}	—	July 29, 2008	Kitt Peak	Spacewatch	L4	7.5 km	MPC · JPL
647142	2008 RC_{92}	—	September 6, 2008	Kitt Peak	Spacewatch	MAS	650 m	MPC · JPL
647143	2008 RF_{99}	—	September 2, 2008	Kitt Peak	Spacewatch	MAS	560 m	MPC · JPL
647144	2008 RJ_{99}	—	September 2, 2008	Kitt Peak	Spacewatch	·	570 m	MPC · JPL
647145	2008 RM_{103}	—	September 5, 2008	Kitt Peak	Spacewatch	·	1.5 km	MPC · JPL
647146	2008 RM_{106}	—	September 7, 2008	Mount Lemmon	Mount Lemmon Survey	MAS	610 m	MPC · JPL
647147	2008 RN_{109}	—	September 2, 2008	Kitt Peak	Spacewatch	L4	7.9 km	MPC · JPL
647148	2008 RN_{110}	—	September 3, 2008	Kitt Peak	Spacewatch	AGN	1.0 km	MPC · JPL
647149	2008 RN_{113}	—	September 5, 2008	Kitt Peak	Spacewatch	V	550 m	MPC · JPL
647150	2008 RV_{113}	—	September 6, 2008	Kitt Peak	Spacewatch	L4	6.2 km	MPC · JPL
647151	2008 RV_{117}	—	September 9, 2008	Kitt Peak	Spacewatch	·	1.2 km	MPC · JPL
647152	2008 RO_{121}	—	September 2, 2008	Kitt Peak	Spacewatch	L4	7.5 km	MPC · JPL
647153	2008 RN_{122}	—	September 4, 2008	Kitt Peak	Spacewatch	L4	7.2 km	MPC · JPL
647154	2008 RG_{123}	—	September 6, 2008	Kitt Peak	Spacewatch	HOF	2.5 km	MPC · JPL
647155	2008 RB_{124}	—	September 6, 2008	Kitt Peak	Spacewatch	L4	8.1 km	MPC · JPL
647156	2008 RC_{126}	—	September 9, 2008	Mount Lemmon	Mount Lemmon Survey	·	800 m	MPC · JPL
647157	2008 RO_{135}	—	September 3, 2008	Kitt Peak	Spacewatch	·	800 m	MPC · JPL
647158	2008 RU_{137}	—	September 5, 2008	Kitt Peak	Spacewatch	·	970 m	MPC · JPL
647159	2008 RY_{141}	—	September 5, 2008	Kitt Peak	Spacewatch	·	630 m	MPC · JPL
647160	2008 RW_{142}	—	September 2, 2008	Kitt Peak	Spacewatch	·	940 m	MPC · JPL
647161	2008 RQ_{147}	—	September 4, 2008	Kitt Peak	Spacewatch	L4	7.3 km	MPC · JPL
647162	2008 RY_{147}	—	September 4, 2008	Kitt Peak	Spacewatch	·	1.7 km	MPC · JPL
647163	2008 RC_{149}	—	September 9, 2008	Mount Lemmon	Mount Lemmon Survey	HOF	2.4 km	MPC · JPL
647164	2008 RP_{149}	—	September 6, 2008	Kitt Peak	Spacewatch	·	2.0 km	MPC · JPL
647165	2008 RW_{149}	—	November 4, 2013	Mount Lemmon	Mount Lemmon Survey	·	2.1 km	MPC · JPL
647166	2008 RS_{150}	—	March 29, 2011	Mount Lemmon	Mount Lemmon Survey	·	2.0 km	MPC · JPL
647167	2008 RK_{151}	—	August 6, 2012	Haleakala	Pan-STARRS 1	·	1.7 km	MPC · JPL
647168	2008 RA_{152}	—	April 8, 2010	WISE	WISE	·	1.1 km	MPC · JPL
647169	2008 RC_{152}	—	September 2, 2008	Kitt Peak	Spacewatch	MAS	530 m	MPC · JPL
647170	2008 RV_{152}	—	September 4, 2008	Kitt Peak	Spacewatch	L4	7.2 km	MPC · JPL
647171	2008 RY_{152}	—	October 24, 2013	Mount Lemmon	Mount Lemmon Survey	·	1.3 km	MPC · JPL
647172	2008 RK_{153}	—	April 5, 2016	Haleakala	Pan-STARRS 1	·	1.5 km	MPC · JPL
647173	2008 RL_{156}	—	November 23, 2012	Kitt Peak	Spacewatch	MAS	600 m	MPC · JPL
647174	2008 RU_{156}	—	September 3, 2008	Kitt Peak	Spacewatch	·	810 m	MPC · JPL
647175	2008 RB_{157}	—	September 6, 2008	Catalina	CSS	·	950 m	MPC · JPL
647176	2008 RK_{157}	—	September 6, 2008	Mount Lemmon	Mount Lemmon Survey	MAS	560 m	MPC · JPL
647177	2008 RQ_{157}	—	September 6, 2008	Mount Lemmon	Mount Lemmon Survey	KOR	1.1 km	MPC · JPL
647178	2008 RV_{157}	—	September 3, 2008	Kitt Peak	Spacewatch	L4	7.1 km	MPC · JPL
647179	2008 RM_{158}	—	September 2, 2008	Kitt Peak	Spacewatch	·	1.6 km	MPC · JPL
647180	2008 RY_{159}	—	September 7, 2008	Mount Lemmon	Mount Lemmon Survey	615	1.1 km	MPC · JPL
647181	2008 RZ_{159}	—	October 23, 2013	Haleakala	Pan-STARRS 1	·	1.4 km	MPC · JPL
647182	2008 RH_{160}	—	November 9, 2013	Haleakala	Pan-STARRS 1	HOF	1.9 km	MPC · JPL
647183	2008 RM_{161}	—	September 3, 2008	Kitt Peak	Spacewatch	L4	7.7 km	MPC · JPL
647184	2008 RM_{162}	—	November 13, 2012	ESA OGS	ESA OGS	·	910 m	MPC · JPL
647185	2008 RV_{162}	—	September 5, 2008	Kitt Peak	Spacewatch	·	1.5 km	MPC · JPL
647186	2008 RA_{164}	—	September 3, 2008	Kitt Peak	Spacewatch	·	970 m	MPC · JPL
647187	2008 RL_{164}	—	September 6, 2008	Mount Lemmon	Mount Lemmon Survey	L4	7.5 km	MPC · JPL
647188	2008 RK_{165}	—	October 21, 2012	Haleakala	Pan-STARRS 1	·	940 m	MPC · JPL
647189	2008 RN_{165}	—	September 5, 2008	Kitt Peak	Spacewatch	V	560 m	MPC · JPL
647190	2008 RR_{165}	—	September 6, 2008	Mount Lemmon	Mount Lemmon Survey	·	1.4 km	MPC · JPL
647191	2008 RA_{166}	—	October 5, 2013	Haleakala	Pan-STARRS 1	·	1.5 km	MPC · JPL
647192	2008 RF_{166}	—	January 2, 2012	Mount Lemmon	Mount Lemmon Survey	L4	6.0 km	MPC · JPL
647193	2008 RT_{166}	—	May 20, 2014	Haleakala	Pan-STARRS 1	·	630 m	MPC · JPL
647194	2008 RJ_{167}	—	September 4, 2008	Kitt Peak	Spacewatch	·	1.9 km	MPC · JPL
647195	2008 RL_{167}	—	September 4, 2008	Kitt Peak	Spacewatch	L4	7.1 km	MPC · JPL
647196	2008 RM_{169}	—	September 2, 2008	Kitt Peak	Spacewatch	V	470 m	MPC · JPL
647197	2008 RN_{169}	—	September 3, 2008	Kitt Peak	Spacewatch	BRA	1.1 km	MPC · JPL
647198	2008 RW_{169}	—	September 5, 2008	Kitt Peak	Spacewatch	·	1.5 km	MPC · JPL
647199	2008 RV_{171}	—	September 2, 2008	Kitt Peak	Spacewatch	·	1.4 km	MPC · JPL
647200	2008 RE_{172}	—	September 7, 2008	Mount Lemmon	Mount Lemmon Survey	AGN	920 m	MPC · JPL

== 647201–647300 ==
back to top

Designation			Discovery			Properties		Ref
Permanent	Provisional	Named after	Date	Site	Discoverer(s)	Category	Diam.	Ref
647201	2008 RM_{172}	—	September 7, 2008	Mount Lemmon	Mount Lemmon Survey	L4	7.3 km	MPC · JPL
647202	2008 RN_{172}	—	September 6, 2008	Kitt Peak	Spacewatch	KOR	950 m	MPC · JPL
647203	2008 RT_{173}	—	September 6, 2008	Mount Lemmon	Mount Lemmon Survey	·	1.3 km	MPC · JPL
647204	2008 RN_{174}	—	September 4, 2008	Kitt Peak	Spacewatch	·	1.3 km	MPC · JPL
647205	2008 RT_{174}	—	September 4, 2008	Kitt Peak	Spacewatch	L4	7.9 km	MPC · JPL
647206	2008 RU_{174}	—	September 2, 2008	Kitt Peak	Spacewatch	L4	7.1 km	MPC · JPL
647207	2008 RW_{174}	—	September 3, 2008	Kitt Peak	Spacewatch	L4	7.4 km	MPC · JPL
647208	2008 RF_{175}	—	September 6, 2008	Kitt Peak	Spacewatch	·	1.4 km	MPC · JPL
647209	2008 RQ_{175}	—	September 6, 2008	Mount Lemmon	Mount Lemmon Survey	L4	8.0 km	MPC · JPL
647210	2008 RY_{175}	—	September 2, 2008	Kitt Peak	Spacewatch	L4	6.8 km	MPC · JPL
647211	2008 RW_{176}	—	September 6, 2008	Mount Lemmon	Mount Lemmon Survey	·	1.6 km	MPC · JPL
647212	2008 RA_{177}	—	September 5, 2008	Kitt Peak	Spacewatch	·	640 m	MPC · JPL
647213	2008 RP_{177}	—	September 4, 2008	Kitt Peak	Spacewatch	HOF	2.2 km	MPC · JPL
647214	2008 RA_{179}	—	September 6, 2008	Kitt Peak	Spacewatch	·	1.7 km	MPC · JPL
647215	2008 RW_{180}	—	September 3, 2008	Kitt Peak	Spacewatch	L4	7.3 km	MPC · JPL
647216	2008 RP_{181}	—	September 4, 2008	Kitt Peak	Spacewatch	HOF	2.0 km	MPC · JPL
647217	2008 RP_{182}	—	September 6, 2008	Kitt Peak	Spacewatch	·	1.5 km	MPC · JPL
647218	2008 RV_{186}	—	September 4, 2008	Kitt Peak	Spacewatch	·	1.3 km	MPC · JPL
647219	2008 SO_{3}	—	September 6, 2008	Catalina	CSS	MAS	650 m	MPC · JPL
647220	2008 SU_{4}	—	September 22, 2008	Socorro	LINEAR	·	810 m	MPC · JPL
647221	2008 SG_{6}	—	August 23, 2008	Kitt Peak	Spacewatch	·	1.1 km	MPC · JPL
647222	2008 SL_{6}	—	September 22, 2008	Socorro	LINEAR	·	580 m	MPC · JPL
647223	2008 ST_{9}	—	September 22, 2008	Socorro	LINEAR	·	1.5 km	MPC · JPL
647224	2008 SR_{10}	—	September 6, 2008	Mount Lemmon	Mount Lemmon Survey	·	490 m	MPC · JPL
647225	2008 SE_{13}	—	September 19, 2008	Kitt Peak	Spacewatch	AGN	1.0 km	MPC · JPL
647226	2008 SW_{15}	—	September 19, 2008	Kitt Peak	Spacewatch	·	870 m	MPC · JPL
647227	2008 SW_{24}	—	September 19, 2008	Kitt Peak	Spacewatch	NYS	980 m	MPC · JPL
647228	2008 SF_{28}	—	September 4, 2008	Kitt Peak	Spacewatch	·	1.1 km	MPC · JPL
647229	2008 SQ_{36}	—	September 7, 2008	Mount Lemmon	Mount Lemmon Survey	·	1.8 km	MPC · JPL
647230	2008 SC_{45}	—	September 20, 2008	Kitt Peak	Spacewatch	·	840 m	MPC · JPL
647231	2008 SU_{67}	—	September 6, 2008	Goodricke-Pigott	R. A. Tucker	·	2.3 km	MPC · JPL
647232	2008 SW_{73}	—	September 4, 2008	Kitt Peak	Spacewatch	L4	7.6 km	MPC · JPL
647233	2008 SX_{74}	—	September 23, 2008	Mount Lemmon	Mount Lemmon Survey	·	1.3 km	MPC · JPL
647234	2008 SY_{76}	—	September 23, 2008	Mount Lemmon	Mount Lemmon Survey	AGN	1.1 km	MPC · JPL
647235	2008 SD_{77}	—	September 23, 2008	Mount Lemmon	Mount Lemmon Survey	L4	6.3 km	MPC · JPL
647236	2008 SJ_{78}	—	September 3, 2008	Kitt Peak	Spacewatch	KOR	1.0 km	MPC · JPL
647237	2008 SL_{78}	—	September 3, 2008	Kitt Peak	Spacewatch	AGN	830 m	MPC · JPL
647238	2008 SR_{78}	—	September 23, 2008	Catalina	CSS	·	940 m	MPC · JPL
647239	2008 SY_{78}	—	August 24, 2008	Kitt Peak	Spacewatch	MRX	900 m	MPC · JPL
647240	2008 SZ_{79}	—	September 23, 2008	Mount Lemmon	Mount Lemmon Survey	·	1.4 km	MPC · JPL
647241	2008 SC_{80}	—	September 23, 2008	Mount Lemmon	Mount Lemmon Survey	·	2.3 km	MPC · JPL
647242	2008 SL_{81}	—	September 23, 2008	Mount Lemmon	Mount Lemmon Survey	WIT	880 m	MPC · JPL
647243	2008 SN_{84}	—	September 23, 2008	Kitt Peak	Spacewatch	·	690 m	MPC · JPL
647244	2008 SS_{87}	—	August 8, 2008	Charleston	R. Holmes	DOR	2.3 km	MPC · JPL
647245	2008 SN_{89}	—	September 21, 2008	Kitt Peak	Spacewatch	HOF	2.2 km	MPC · JPL
647246	2008 SM_{91}	—	September 9, 2008	Mount Lemmon	Mount Lemmon Survey	·	1.1 km	MPC · JPL
647247	2008 SA_{98}	—	September 21, 2008	Kitt Peak	Spacewatch	·	930 m	MPC · JPL
647248	2008 SJ_{109}	—	September 22, 2008	Mount Lemmon	Mount Lemmon Survey	·	790 m	MPC · JPL
647249	2008 SK_{109}	—	September 22, 2008	Mount Lemmon	Mount Lemmon Survey	·	1.7 km	MPC · JPL
647250	2008 SS_{113}	—	January 31, 2006	Kitt Peak	Spacewatch	·	840 m	MPC · JPL
647251	2008 SO_{114}	—	September 22, 2008	Kitt Peak	Spacewatch	·	760 m	MPC · JPL
647252	2008 SW_{116}	—	September 22, 2008	Mount Lemmon	Mount Lemmon Survey	NYS	810 m	MPC · JPL
647253	2008 SF_{118}	—	September 22, 2008	Mount Lemmon	Mount Lemmon Survey	·	820 m	MPC · JPL
647254	2008 SU_{119}	—	September 22, 2008	Mount Lemmon	Mount Lemmon Survey	·	800 m	MPC · JPL
647255	2008 SD_{122}	—	September 22, 2008	Mount Lemmon	Mount Lemmon Survey	MAS	650 m	MPC · JPL
647256	2008 SQ_{124}	—	September 22, 2008	Mount Lemmon	Mount Lemmon Survey	·	740 m	MPC · JPL
647257	2008 SK_{133}	—	September 27, 2001	Palomar	NEAT	·	810 m	MPC · JPL
647258	2008 SV_{133}	—	September 23, 2008	Kitt Peak	Spacewatch	L4	6.8 km	MPC · JPL
647259	2008 SU_{135}	—	September 23, 2008	Mount Lemmon	Mount Lemmon Survey	·	1.8 km	MPC · JPL
647260	2008 SB_{138}	—	September 23, 2008	Mount Lemmon	Mount Lemmon Survey	·	840 m	MPC · JPL
647261	2008 SU_{138}	—	September 23, 2008	Kitt Peak	Spacewatch	·	700 m	MPC · JPL
647262	2008 SK_{141}	—	September 24, 2008	Kitt Peak	Spacewatch	·	1.5 km	MPC · JPL
647263	2008 SL_{141}	—	July 29, 2008	Kitt Peak	Spacewatch	TIR	3.4 km	MPC · JPL
647264	2008 SX_{144}	—	September 25, 2008	Mount Lemmon	Mount Lemmon Survey	·	1.6 km	MPC · JPL
647265	2008 ST_{151}	—	July 30, 2008	Kitt Peak	Spacewatch	ERI	1.3 km	MPC · JPL
647266	2008 SQ_{159}	—	September 10, 2008	Kitt Peak	Spacewatch	·	1.3 km	MPC · JPL
647267	2008 SA_{160}	—	September 19, 2008	Kitt Peak	Spacewatch	·	820 m	MPC · JPL
647268	2008 SL_{163}	—	September 4, 2008	Kitt Peak	Spacewatch	·	1.1 km	MPC · JPL
647269	2008 SW_{163}	—	September 3, 2008	Kitt Peak	Spacewatch	MAS	660 m	MPC · JPL
647270	2008 SZ_{167}	—	September 28, 2008	Socorro	LINEAR	·	1.6 km	MPC · JPL
647271	2008 SB_{171}	—	September 21, 2008	Mount Lemmon	Mount Lemmon Survey	L4	7.0 km	MPC · JPL
647272	2008 SG_{173}	—	September 22, 2008	Mount Lemmon	Mount Lemmon Survey	NYS	950 m	MPC · JPL
647273	2008 SH_{173}	—	September 22, 2008	Mount Lemmon	Mount Lemmon Survey	·	1.0 km	MPC · JPL
647274	2008 SS_{176}	—	September 3, 2008	Kitt Peak	Spacewatch	·	1.3 km	MPC · JPL
647275	2008 SZ_{176}	—	September 23, 2008	Mount Lemmon	Mount Lemmon Survey	·	880 m	MPC · JPL
647276	2008 SU_{178}	—	August 24, 2008	Kitt Peak	Spacewatch	·	970 m	MPC · JPL
647277	2008 SS_{180}	—	September 24, 2008	Kitt Peak	Spacewatch	·	1.3 km	MPC · JPL
647278	2008 SN_{183}	—	September 24, 2008	Kitt Peak	Spacewatch	·	1.8 km	MPC · JPL
647279	2008 SG_{189}	—	September 5, 2008	Kitt Peak	Spacewatch	·	1.5 km	MPC · JPL
647280	2008 SC_{191}	—	September 25, 2008	Mount Lemmon	Mount Lemmon Survey	·	670 m	MPC · JPL
647281	2008 SB_{193}	—	September 25, 2008	Kitt Peak	Spacewatch	·	1.6 km	MPC · JPL
647282	2008 SV_{193}	—	September 25, 2008	Kitt Peak	Spacewatch	·	1.0 km	MPC · JPL
647283	2008 SA_{197}	—	September 25, 2008	Kitt Peak	Spacewatch	·	1.0 km	MPC · JPL
647284	2008 SM_{205}	—	March 10, 2005	Mount Lemmon	Mount Lemmon Survey	·	3.6 km	MPC · JPL
647285	2008 SV_{205}	—	December 20, 2004	Mount Lemmon	Mount Lemmon Survey	HOF	3.3 km	MPC · JPL
647286	2008 SA_{211}	—	September 9, 2008	Kitt Peak	Spacewatch	V	530 m	MPC · JPL
647287	2008 SP_{213}	—	September 11, 2008	Bergisch Gladbach	W. Bickel	AGN	1.2 km	MPC · JPL
647288	2008 SE_{214}	—	September 29, 2008	Mount Lemmon	Mount Lemmon Survey	L4	6.6 km	MPC · JPL
647289	2008 SZ_{214}	—	September 29, 2008	Mount Lemmon	Mount Lemmon Survey	AST	1.4 km	MPC · JPL
647290	2008 SL_{220}	—	September 16, 2008	Mauna Kea	D. J. Tholen	MAS	600 m	MPC · JPL
647291	2008 SZ_{220}	—	September 25, 2008	Kitt Peak	Spacewatch	KOR	960 m	MPC · JPL
647292	2008 SA_{221}	—	September 25, 2008	Kitt Peak	Spacewatch	·	570 m	MPC · JPL
647293	2008 SE_{221}	—	September 25, 2008	Mount Lemmon	Mount Lemmon Survey	L4	6.8 km	MPC · JPL
647294	2008 SC_{223}	—	September 25, 2008	Mount Lemmon	Mount Lemmon Survey	L4	6.9 km	MPC · JPL
647295	2008 SY_{230}	—	September 28, 2008	Mount Lemmon	Mount Lemmon Survey	L4	6.4 km	MPC · JPL
647296	2008 SK_{235}	—	September 28, 2008	Mount Lemmon	Mount Lemmon Survey	·	1.7 km	MPC · JPL
647297	2008 SY_{236}	—	September 29, 2008	Kitt Peak	Spacewatch	·	990 m	MPC · JPL
647298	2008 SD_{239}	—	September 29, 2008	Mount Lemmon	Mount Lemmon Survey	·	1.7 km	MPC · JPL
647299	2008 SU_{243}	—	September 30, 2008	Mount Lemmon	Mount Lemmon Survey	·	1.4 km	MPC · JPL
647300	2008 SF_{246}	—	September 24, 2008	Catalina	CSS	·	1.8 km	MPC · JPL

== 647301–647400 ==
back to top

Designation			Discovery			Properties		Ref
Permanent	Provisional	Named after	Date	Site	Discoverer(s)	Category	Diam.	Ref
647301	2008 SP_{247}	—	September 3, 2008	Kitt Peak	Spacewatch	AST	1.4 km	MPC · JPL
647302	2008 SM_{253}	—	September 21, 2008	Mount Lemmon	Mount Lemmon Survey	·	1.1 km	MPC · JPL
647303	2008 SJ_{257}	—	September 22, 2008	Kitt Peak	Spacewatch	·	950 m	MPC · JPL
647304	2008 SU_{257}	—	September 22, 2008	Mount Lemmon	Mount Lemmon Survey	·	1.0 km	MPC · JPL
647305	2008 SK_{263}	—	September 24, 2008	Kitt Peak	Spacewatch	MAS	490 m	MPC · JPL
647306	2008 SQ_{265}	—	September 29, 2008	Kitt Peak	Spacewatch	·	1.0 km	MPC · JPL
647307	2008 SY_{274}	—	September 22, 2008	Kitt Peak	Spacewatch	L4	7.4 km	MPC · JPL
647308	2008 SY_{275}	—	September 23, 2008	Mount Lemmon	Mount Lemmon Survey	L4	6.9 km	MPC · JPL
647309	2008 SE_{276}	—	September 23, 2008	Mount Lemmon	Mount Lemmon Survey	L4	8.2 km	MPC · JPL
647310	2008 SZ_{276}	—	September 24, 2008	Mount Lemmon	Mount Lemmon Survey	L4	7.3 km	MPC · JPL
647311	2008 SB_{277}	—	September 24, 2008	Mount Lemmon	Mount Lemmon Survey	L4	6.6 km	MPC · JPL
647312	2008 SP_{277}	—	September 24, 2008	Kitt Peak	Spacewatch	L4	7.2 km	MPC · JPL
647313	2008 SS_{279}	—	September 24, 2008	Kitt Peak	Spacewatch	·	1.5 km	MPC · JPL
647314	2008 SS_{292}	—	September 22, 2008	Catalina	CSS	ADE	1.6 km	MPC · JPL
647315	2008 SO_{293}	—	September 30, 2008	Mount Lemmon	Mount Lemmon Survey	·	1.7 km	MPC · JPL
647316	2008 SY_{295}	—	September 28, 2008	Catalina	CSS	·	1.7 km	MPC · JPL
647317	2008 SY_{297}	—	September 19, 2008	Kitt Peak	Spacewatch	·	990 m	MPC · JPL
647318	2008 SM_{304}	—	September 24, 2008	Mount Lemmon	Mount Lemmon Survey	·	1.0 km	MPC · JPL
647319	2008 SA_{305}	—	September 26, 2008	Kitt Peak	Spacewatch	·	810 m	MPC · JPL
647320	2008 SJ_{310}	—	September 23, 2008	Mount Lemmon	Mount Lemmon Survey	·	470 m	MPC · JPL
647321	2008 SS_{313}	—	September 23, 2008	Mount Lemmon	Mount Lemmon Survey	·	3.0 km	MPC · JPL
647322	2008 SW_{313}	—	March 15, 2007	Kitt Peak	Spacewatch	V	620 m	MPC · JPL
647323	2008 SD_{314}	—	September 29, 2008	Kitt Peak	Spacewatch	AGN	1.2 km	MPC · JPL
647324	2008 SH_{314}	—	October 13, 2013	Kitt Peak	Spacewatch	AST	1.4 km	MPC · JPL
647325	2008 SK_{314}	—	September 27, 2008	Siding Spring	SSS	·	2.0 km	MPC · JPL
647326	2008 SL_{314}	—	August 28, 2016	Mount Lemmon	Mount Lemmon Survey	·	1.4 km	MPC · JPL
647327	2008 SU_{314}	—	September 29, 2008	Mount Lemmon	Mount Lemmon Survey	·	890 m	MPC · JPL
647328	2008 SY_{314}	—	September 27, 2008	Mount Lemmon	Mount Lemmon Survey	·	900 m	MPC · JPL
647329	2008 SE_{316}	—	September 24, 2008	Mount Lemmon	Mount Lemmon Survey	·	1.1 km	MPC · JPL
647330	2008 SR_{316}	—	September 24, 2008	Mount Lemmon	Mount Lemmon Survey	·	880 m	MPC · JPL
647331	2008 SM_{317}	—	October 8, 2012	Kitt Peak	Spacewatch	V	530 m	MPC · JPL
647332	2008 SU_{318}	—	February 9, 2013	Haleakala	Pan-STARRS 1	·	570 m	MPC · JPL
647333	2008 SA_{319}	—	September 23, 2008	Mount Lemmon	Mount Lemmon Survey	·	1.6 km	MPC · JPL
647334	2008 SM_{319}	—	January 23, 2015	Haleakala	Pan-STARRS 1	·	1.8 km	MPC · JPL
647335	2008 SR_{319}	—	September 23, 2008	Kitt Peak	Spacewatch	·	1.6 km	MPC · JPL
647336	2008 SF_{321}	—	September 20, 2008	Mount Lemmon	Mount Lemmon Survey	H	440 m	MPC · JPL
647337	2008 SO_{323}	—	September 24, 2008	Kitt Peak	Spacewatch	V	430 m	MPC · JPL
647338	2008 SL_{325}	—	September 23, 2008	Kitt Peak	Spacewatch	NYS	840 m	MPC · JPL
647339	2008 SF_{326}	—	July 30, 2017	Haleakala	Pan-STARRS 1	·	1.3 km	MPC · JPL
647340	2008 SJ_{326}	—	November 14, 2013	Mount Lemmon	Mount Lemmon Survey	·	2.5 km	MPC · JPL
647341	2008 SS_{326}	—	July 28, 2015	Haleakala	Pan-STARRS 1	·	720 m	MPC · JPL
647342	2008 SR_{328}	—	December 24, 2017	Haleakala	Pan-STARRS 1	·	3.8 km	MPC · JPL
647343	2008 ST_{331}	—	October 1, 2014	Haleakala	Pan-STARRS 1	·	2.5 km	MPC · JPL
647344	2008 SJ_{332}	—	March 29, 2011	Mount Lemmon	Mount Lemmon Survey	·	1.4 km	MPC · JPL
647345	2008 SP_{332}	—	November 2, 2010	Mount Lemmon	Mount Lemmon Survey	L4	6.7 km	MPC · JPL
647346	2008 SS_{333}	—	September 19, 2008	Kitt Peak	Spacewatch	·	1.6 km	MPC · JPL
647347	2008 SB_{334}	—	March 15, 2016	Haleakala	Pan-STARRS 1	·	1.9 km	MPC · JPL
647348	2008 SN_{334}	—	February 16, 2015	Haleakala	Pan-STARRS 1	L4	7.9 km	MPC · JPL
647349	2008 SJ_{336}	—	November 8, 2009	Mount Lemmon	Mount Lemmon Survey	L4	7.6 km	MPC · JPL
647350	2008 SO_{336}	—	September 19, 2008	Kitt Peak	Spacewatch	·	3.6 km	MPC · JPL
647351	2008 SU_{336}	—	September 29, 2008	Kitt Peak	Spacewatch	·	1.0 km	MPC · JPL
647352	2008 SC_{337}	—	September 28, 2008	Mount Lemmon	Mount Lemmon Survey	SYL	3.7 km	MPC · JPL
647353	2008 SF_{337}	—	January 15, 2015	Haleakala	Pan-STARRS 1	·	1.6 km	MPC · JPL
647354	2008 SY_{337}	—	October 15, 2013	Kitt Peak	Spacewatch	HOF	2.1 km	MPC · JPL
647355	2008 SW_{338}	—	September 21, 2008	Mount Lemmon	Mount Lemmon Survey	KOR	970 m	MPC · JPL
647356	2008 SF_{339}	—	September 21, 2008	Kitt Peak	Spacewatch	·	1.4 km	MPC · JPL
647357	2008 SG_{340}	—	September 28, 2008	Mount Lemmon	Mount Lemmon Survey	L4	6.6 km	MPC · JPL
647358	2008 SH_{340}	—	September 28, 2008	Mount Lemmon	Mount Lemmon Survey	·	1.3 km	MPC · JPL
647359	2008 SM_{340}	—	September 24, 2008	Kitt Peak	Spacewatch	·	2.4 km	MPC · JPL
647360	2008 SP_{340}	—	September 24, 2008	Mount Lemmon	Mount Lemmon Survey	·	2.0 km	MPC · JPL
647361	2008 SG_{341}	—	July 17, 2004	Cerro Tololo	Deep Ecliptic Survey	CLA	1.2 km	MPC · JPL
647362	2008 SA_{342}	—	September 23, 2008	Mount Lemmon	Mount Lemmon Survey	·	1.4 km	MPC · JPL
647363	2008 SO_{342}	—	September 23, 2008	Kitt Peak	Spacewatch	·	1.0 km	MPC · JPL
647364	2008 SW_{342}	—	September 24, 2008	Mount Lemmon	Mount Lemmon Survey	HOF	2.2 km	MPC · JPL
647365	2008 SZ_{342}	—	September 26, 2008	Kitt Peak	Spacewatch	·	700 m	MPC · JPL
647366	2008 SG_{344}	—	September 21, 2008	Mount Lemmon	Mount Lemmon Survey	·	1.7 km	MPC · JPL
647367	2008 SH_{344}	—	September 25, 2008	Mount Lemmon	Mount Lemmon Survey	L4	7.9 km	MPC · JPL
647368	2008 SU_{346}	—	September 23, 2008	Kitt Peak	Spacewatch	L4	8.3 km	MPC · JPL
647369	2008 SA_{347}	—	September 22, 2008	Kitt Peak	Spacewatch	·	890 m	MPC · JPL
647370	2008 SF_{347}	—	September 22, 2008	Mount Lemmon	Mount Lemmon Survey	L4	7.3 km	MPC · JPL
647371	2008 ST_{347}	—	September 23, 2008	Mount Lemmon	Mount Lemmon Survey	·	1.8 km	MPC · JPL
647372	2008 SY_{347}	—	September 23, 2008	Mount Lemmon	Mount Lemmon Survey	L4	7.1 km	MPC · JPL
647373	2008 SA_{348}	—	September 20, 2008	Mount Lemmon	Mount Lemmon Survey	L4	7.9 km	MPC · JPL
647374	2008 SM_{348}	—	September 29, 2008	Kitt Peak	Spacewatch	MAS	620 m	MPC · JPL
647375	2008 SJ_{349}	—	September 23, 2008	Mount Lemmon	Mount Lemmon Survey	·	1.8 km	MPC · JPL
647376	2008 SY_{349}	—	September 23, 2008	Mount Lemmon	Mount Lemmon Survey	KOR	1.0 km	MPC · JPL
647377	2008 SG_{350}	—	September 23, 2008	Mount Lemmon	Mount Lemmon Survey	·	1.2 km	MPC · JPL
647378	2008 SP_{350}	—	September 25, 2008	Kitt Peak	Spacewatch	·	1.2 km	MPC · JPL
647379	2008 TM	—	September 7, 2008	Catalina	CSS	·	960 m	MPC · JPL
647380	2008 TC_{7}	—	October 1, 2008	Mount Lemmon	Mount Lemmon Survey	·	1.6 km	MPC · JPL
647381	2008 TS_{13}	—	October 1, 2008	Mount Lemmon	Mount Lemmon Survey	·	1.5 km	MPC · JPL
647382	2008 TK_{16}	—	October 1, 2008	Mount Lemmon	Mount Lemmon Survey	·	1.6 km	MPC · JPL
647383	2008 TF_{23}	—	September 20, 2008	Mount Lemmon	Mount Lemmon Survey	GAL	1.6 km	MPC · JPL
647384	2008 TB_{25}	—	September 4, 2008	Kitt Peak	Spacewatch	NYS	930 m	MPC · JPL
647385	2008 TL_{28}	—	October 1, 2008	Mount Lemmon	Mount Lemmon Survey	·	1.1 km	MPC · JPL
647386	2008 TO_{36}	—	September 21, 2008	Kitt Peak	Spacewatch	NYS	1.1 km	MPC · JPL
647387	2008 TP_{37}	—	October 1, 2008	Mount Lemmon	Mount Lemmon Survey	·	1.5 km	MPC · JPL
647388	2008 TV_{37}	—	March 23, 2014	Kitt Peak	Spacewatch	·	760 m	MPC · JPL
647389	2008 TQ_{40}	—	October 1, 2008	Mount Lemmon	Mount Lemmon Survey	·	1.9 km	MPC · JPL
647390	2008 TS_{40}	—	January 25, 2003	Apache Point	SDSS Collaboration	·	670 m	MPC · JPL
647391	2008 TV_{40}	—	October 1, 2008	Mount Lemmon	Mount Lemmon Survey	·	1.5 km	MPC · JPL
647392	2008 TW_{41}	—	September 23, 2008	Catalina	CSS	·	1.1 km	MPC · JPL
647393	2008 TE_{44}	—	October 1, 2008	Mount Lemmon	Mount Lemmon Survey	·	920 m	MPC · JPL
647394	2008 TA_{47}	—	October 19, 2003	Kitt Peak	Spacewatch	·	1.9 km	MPC · JPL
647395	2008 TH_{48}	—	October 11, 2004	Kitt Peak	Spacewatch	·	1.7 km	MPC · JPL
647396	2008 TY_{49}	—	October 2, 2008	Kitt Peak	Spacewatch	AGN	1.1 km	MPC · JPL
647397	2008 TQ_{53}	—	September 6, 2008	Mount Lemmon	Mount Lemmon Survey	·	900 m	MPC · JPL
647398	2008 TC_{57}	—	October 2, 2008	Kitt Peak	Spacewatch	·	640 m	MPC · JPL
647399	2008 TO_{57}	—	March 26, 2003	Kitt Peak	Spacewatch	V	650 m	MPC · JPL
647400	2008 TB_{58}	—	September 24, 2008	Kitt Peak	Spacewatch	·	900 m	MPC · JPL

== 647401–647500 ==
back to top

Designation			Discovery			Properties		Ref
Permanent	Provisional	Named after	Date	Site	Discoverer(s)	Category	Diam.	Ref
647401	2008 TJ_{62}	—	September 20, 2008	Kitt Peak	Spacewatch	V	530 m	MPC · JPL
647402	2008 TO_{62}	—	September 6, 2008	Mount Lemmon	Mount Lemmon Survey	MAS	520 m	MPC · JPL
647403	2008 TH_{69}	—	October 2, 2008	Kitt Peak	Spacewatch	·	1.6 km	MPC · JPL
647404	2008 TL_{69}	—	September 20, 2008	Kitt Peak	Spacewatch	DOR	2.1 km	MPC · JPL
647405	2008 TV_{73}	—	September 23, 2008	Mount Lemmon	Mount Lemmon Survey	NYS	720 m	MPC · JPL
647406	2008 TZ_{75}	—	October 2, 2008	Mount Lemmon	Mount Lemmon Survey	L4	6.8 km	MPC · JPL
647407	2008 TA_{79}	—	September 2, 2008	Kitt Peak	Spacewatch	NYS	920 m	MPC · JPL
647408	2008 TQ_{93}	—	September 3, 2008	Kitt Peak	Spacewatch	MAS	680 m	MPC · JPL
647409	2008 TT_{93}	—	September 22, 2008	Kitt Peak	Spacewatch	·	980 m	MPC · JPL
647410	2008 TO_{94}	—	October 7, 2008	Catalina	CSS	·	1.4 km	MPC · JPL
647411	2008 TT_{97}	—	January 10, 2006	Mount Lemmon	Mount Lemmon Survey	·	780 m	MPC · JPL
647412	2008 TH_{102}	—	September 20, 2008	Kitt Peak	Spacewatch	·	1.5 km	MPC · JPL
647413	2008 TE_{107}	—	September 23, 2008	Mount Lemmon	Mount Lemmon Survey	MAS	540 m	MPC · JPL
647414	2008 TK_{107}	—	September 23, 2008	Mount Lemmon	Mount Lemmon Survey	·	1.6 km	MPC · JPL
647415	2008 TA_{108}	—	October 6, 2008	Mount Lemmon	Mount Lemmon Survey	·	790 m	MPC · JPL
647416	2008 TC_{110}	—	October 6, 2008	Mount Lemmon	Mount Lemmon Survey	·	1.5 km	MPC · JPL
647417	2008 TD_{117}	—	September 3, 2008	Kitt Peak	Spacewatch	L4	7.2 km	MPC · JPL
647418	2008 TJ_{118}	—	October 6, 2008	Kitt Peak	Spacewatch	·	970 m	MPC · JPL
647419	2008 TS_{118}	—	August 24, 2008	Kitt Peak	Spacewatch	NYS	960 m	MPC · JPL
647420	2008 TY_{118}	—	September 3, 2008	Kitt Peak	Spacewatch	·	1.5 km	MPC · JPL
647421	2008 TH_{120}	—	September 26, 2008	Kitt Peak	Spacewatch	·	1.8 km	MPC · JPL
647422	2008 TJ_{121}	—	September 29, 2008	Catalina	CSS	·	1.2 km	MPC · JPL
647423	2008 TF_{124}	—	October 22, 2003	Kitt Peak	Spacewatch	EOS	1.7 km	MPC · JPL
647424	2008 TN_{129}	—	October 8, 2008	Mount Lemmon	Mount Lemmon Survey	·	760 m	MPC · JPL
647425	2008 TR_{142}	—	October 9, 2008	Mount Lemmon	Mount Lemmon Survey	L4	6.2 km	MPC · JPL
647426	2008 TX_{144}	—	September 2, 2008	Kitt Peak	Spacewatch	·	820 m	MPC · JPL
647427	2008 TD_{145}	—	October 9, 2008	Mount Lemmon	Mount Lemmon Survey	NYS	710 m	MPC · JPL
647428	2008 TX_{145}	—	September 3, 2008	Kitt Peak	Spacewatch	·	1.5 km	MPC · JPL
647429	2008 TS_{148}	—	October 9, 2008	Mount Lemmon	Mount Lemmon Survey	·	1.3 km	MPC · JPL
647430	2008 TV_{153}	—	October 9, 2008	Mount Lemmon	Mount Lemmon Survey	·	2.2 km	MPC · JPL
647431	2008 TX_{153}	—	October 9, 2008	Mount Lemmon	Mount Lemmon Survey	·	1.0 km	MPC · JPL
647432	2008 TD_{154}	—	September 18, 2003	Palomar	NEAT	·	2.4 km	MPC · JPL
647433	2008 TB_{155}	—	September 20, 2003	Kitt Peak	Spacewatch	·	1.7 km	MPC · JPL
647434	2008 TF_{157}	—	October 3, 2008	Hibiscus	Teamo, N.	·	1.9 km	MPC · JPL
647435	2008 TQ_{157}	—	September 22, 2008	Catalina	CSS	·	1.0 km	MPC · JPL
647436	2008 TJ_{171}	—	October 10, 2008	Mount Lemmon	Mount Lemmon Survey	·	1.7 km	MPC · JPL
647437	2008 TB_{173}	—	September 24, 2008	Mount Lemmon	Mount Lemmon Survey	·	1.9 km	MPC · JPL
647438	2008 TK_{174}	—	October 3, 2008	Kitt Peak	Spacewatch	·	880 m	MPC · JPL
647439	2008 TR_{174}	—	May 13, 2007	Mount Lemmon	Mount Lemmon Survey	·	1.0 km	MPC · JPL
647440	2008 TU_{175}	—	October 9, 2008	Mount Lemmon	Mount Lemmon Survey	·	1.5 km	MPC · JPL
647441	2008 TV_{175}	—	October 9, 2008	Mount Lemmon	Mount Lemmon Survey	·	1.5 km	MPC · JPL
647442	2008 TZ_{175}	—	October 10, 2008	Kitt Peak	Spacewatch	·	1.1 km	MPC · JPL
647443	2008 TA_{179}	—	October 1, 2008	Catalina	CSS	·	1.3 km	MPC · JPL
647444	2008 TL_{183}	—	October 2, 2008	Mount Lemmon	Mount Lemmon Survey	GEF	1.0 km	MPC · JPL
647445	2008 TF_{188}	—	October 24, 2005	Mauna Kea	A. Boattini	·	840 m	MPC · JPL
647446	2008 TE_{193}	—	October 4, 2008	La Sagra	OAM	ERI	1.2 km	MPC · JPL
647447	2008 TF_{193}	—	September 20, 2008	Kitt Peak	Spacewatch	·	990 m	MPC · JPL
647448	2008 TV_{193}	—	October 10, 2008	Catalina	CSS	DOR	2.1 km	MPC · JPL
647449	2008 TQ_{194}	—	November 5, 2012	Catalina	CSS	·	1.2 km	MPC · JPL
647450	2008 TR_{194}	—	October 7, 2008	Mount Lemmon	Mount Lemmon Survey	·	1.6 km	MPC · JPL
647451	2008 TK_{195}	—	October 30, 2013	Haleakala	Pan-STARRS 1	·	2.0 km	MPC · JPL
647452	2008 TH_{196}	—	October 8, 2008	Mount Lemmon	Mount Lemmon Survey	·	860 m	MPC · JPL
647453	2008 TM_{196}	—	October 7, 2008	Catalina	CSS	·	1.3 km	MPC · JPL
647454	2008 TW_{196}	—	April 6, 2011	Kitt Peak	Spacewatch	·	1.6 km	MPC · JPL
647455	2008 TG_{198}	—	November 22, 2017	Mount Lemmon	Mount Lemmon Survey	·	1.4 km	MPC · JPL
647456	2008 TW_{198}	—	September 9, 2015	Haleakala	Pan-STARRS 1	CLA	1.3 km	MPC · JPL
647457	2008 TS_{199}	—	May 3, 2014	Mount Lemmon	Mount Lemmon Survey	·	1.1 km	MPC · JPL
647458	2008 TJ_{200}	—	October 10, 2008	Mount Lemmon	Mount Lemmon Survey	·	1.7 km	MPC · JPL
647459	2008 TV_{200}	—	October 1, 2008	Mount Lemmon	Mount Lemmon Survey	V	420 m	MPC · JPL
647460	2008 TE_{202}	—	October 9, 2008	Mount Lemmon	Mount Lemmon Survey	·	1.4 km	MPC · JPL
647461	2008 TN_{203}	—	September 19, 2008	Kitt Peak	Spacewatch	V	440 m	MPC · JPL
647462	2008 TC_{204}	—	October 1, 2008	Kitt Peak	Spacewatch	·	1.5 km	MPC · JPL
647463	2008 TQ_{204}	—	July 1, 2017	Haleakala	Pan-STARRS 1	·	1.6 km	MPC · JPL
647464	2008 TX_{204}	—	October 1, 2008	Kitt Peak	Spacewatch	·	1.1 km	MPC · JPL
647465	2008 TG_{206}	—	October 8, 2008	Mount Lemmon	Mount Lemmon Survey	·	940 m	MPC · JPL
647466	2008 TN_{206}	—	October 9, 2008	Kitt Peak	Spacewatch	·	1.7 km	MPC · JPL
647467	2008 TD_{208}	—	September 24, 2013	Kitt Peak	Spacewatch	·	1.5 km	MPC · JPL
647468	2008 TG_{211}	—	October 19, 2012	Haleakala	Pan-STARRS 1	·	950 m	MPC · JPL
647469	2008 TK_{211}	—	May 8, 2011	Mount Lemmon	Mount Lemmon Survey	·	1 km	MPC · JPL
647470	2008 TU_{211}	—	October 10, 2008	Mount Lemmon	Mount Lemmon Survey	·	1.5 km	MPC · JPL
647471	2008 TF_{213}	—	August 8, 2015	Haleakala	Pan-STARRS 1	·	1.1 km	MPC · JPL
647472	2008 TK_{213}	—	May 21, 2014	Haleakala	Pan-STARRS 1	·	830 m	MPC · JPL
647473	2008 TK_{215}	—	December 21, 2014	Haleakala	Pan-STARRS 1	KOR	1.1 km	MPC · JPL
647474	2008 TY_{217}	—	October 6, 2008	Mount Lemmon	Mount Lemmon Survey	L4	7.3 km	MPC · JPL
647475	2008 TB_{218}	—	October 1, 2008	Kitt Peak	Spacewatch	·	1.4 km	MPC · JPL
647476	2008 TH_{218}	—	October 8, 2008	Kitt Peak	Spacewatch	KOR	990 m	MPC · JPL
647477	2008 TL_{219}	—	October 10, 2008	Kitt Peak	Spacewatch	·	1.3 km	MPC · JPL
647478	2008 TW_{220}	—	October 1, 2008	Mount Lemmon	Mount Lemmon Survey	L4	6.0 km	MPC · JPL
647479	2008 TA_{221}	—	October 2, 2008	Mount Lemmon	Mount Lemmon Survey	·	3.9 km	MPC · JPL
647480	2008 TH_{222}	—	October 7, 2008	Mount Lemmon	Mount Lemmon Survey	L4	10 km	MPC · JPL
647481	2008 TK_{222}	—	October 8, 2008	Catalina	CSS	·	800 m	MPC · JPL
647482	2008 TT_{222}	—	October 10, 2008	Mount Lemmon	Mount Lemmon Survey	·	3.4 km	MPC · JPL
647483	2008 TK_{224}	—	October 2, 2008	Kitt Peak	Spacewatch	L4	6.9 km	MPC · JPL
647484	2008 TN_{227}	—	October 8, 2008	Mount Lemmon	Mount Lemmon Survey	·	1.5 km	MPC · JPL
647485	2008 TR_{227}	—	October 10, 2008	Mount Lemmon	Mount Lemmon Survey	L4	5.9 km	MPC · JPL
647486	2008 TJ_{228}	—	September 22, 2008	Kitt Peak	Spacewatch	H	250 m	MPC · JPL
647487	2008 TP_{228}	—	October 8, 2008	Kitt Peak	Spacewatch	·	830 m	MPC · JPL
647488	2008 TM_{234}	—	October 9, 2008	Mount Lemmon	Mount Lemmon Survey	·	900 m	MPC · JPL
647489	2008 TZ_{237}	—	October 10, 2008	Mount Lemmon	Mount Lemmon Survey	·	1.8 km	MPC · JPL
647490	2008 UT_{10}	—	November 17, 1999	Kitt Peak	Spacewatch	·	1.6 km	MPC · JPL
647491	2008 UR_{14}	—	October 18, 2008	Kitt Peak	Spacewatch	·	1.7 km	MPC · JPL
647492	2008 UO_{17}	—	October 18, 2008	Kitt Peak	Spacewatch	KOR	960 m	MPC · JPL
647493	2008 UV_{17}	—	October 10, 2008	Kitt Peak	Spacewatch	·	1.4 km	MPC · JPL
647494	2008 UO_{18}	—	October 19, 2008	Kitt Peak	Spacewatch	·	1.4 km	MPC · JPL
647495	2008 UP_{19}	—	October 19, 2008	Kitt Peak	Spacewatch	·	730 m	MPC · JPL
647496	2008 UV_{19}	—	October 19, 2008	Kitt Peak	Spacewatch	·	1.0 km	MPC · JPL
647497	2008 UL_{20}	—	February 21, 2003	Palomar	NEAT	·	960 m	MPC · JPL
647498	2008 UR_{23}	—	September 23, 2008	Mount Lemmon	Mount Lemmon Survey	·	700 m	MPC · JPL
647499	2008 UG_{25}	—	October 20, 2008	Mount Lemmon	Mount Lemmon Survey	·	1.6 km	MPC · JPL
647500	2008 UP_{25}	—	October 10, 2008	Kitt Peak	Spacewatch	L4	6.3 km	MPC · JPL

== 647501–647600 ==
back to top

Designation			Discovery			Properties		Ref
Permanent	Provisional	Named after	Date	Site	Discoverer(s)	Category	Diam.	Ref
647501	2008 UV_{27}	—	September 6, 2008	Mount Lemmon	Mount Lemmon Survey	·	1.1 km	MPC · JPL
647502	2008 UL_{28}	—	October 20, 2008	Kitt Peak	Spacewatch	·	1.3 km	MPC · JPL
647503	2008 UO_{28}	—	October 20, 2008	Kitt Peak	Spacewatch	·	1.0 km	MPC · JPL
647504	2008 UW_{28}	—	October 20, 2008	Kitt Peak	Spacewatch	·	850 m	MPC · JPL
647505	2008 UR_{37}	—	October 20, 2008	Kitt Peak	Spacewatch	·	1.5 km	MPC · JPL
647506	2008 UX_{40}	—	September 22, 2008	Mount Lemmon	Mount Lemmon Survey	·	1.2 km	MPC · JPL
647507	2008 UO_{41}	—	October 20, 2008	Kitt Peak	Spacewatch	·	1.6 km	MPC · JPL
647508	2008 UF_{55}	—	September 7, 2008	Mount Lemmon	Mount Lemmon Survey	·	750 m	MPC · JPL
647509	2008 UM_{57}	—	September 23, 2008	Kitt Peak	Spacewatch	V	480 m	MPC · JPL
647510	2008 UQ_{62}	—	October 21, 2008	Kitt Peak	Spacewatch	·	1.0 km	MPC · JPL
647511	2008 UT_{63}	—	October 7, 2008	Mount Lemmon	Mount Lemmon Survey	·	920 m	MPC · JPL
647512	2008 UW_{63}	—	December 30, 2005	Kitt Peak	Spacewatch	·	800 m	MPC · JPL
647513	2008 UK_{69}	—	September 23, 2008	Mount Lemmon	Mount Lemmon Survey	AGN	1.1 km	MPC · JPL
647514	2008 US_{69}	—	September 24, 2008	Mount Lemmon	Mount Lemmon Survey	·	1.9 km	MPC · JPL
647515	2008 UW_{71}	—	October 21, 2008	Kitt Peak	Spacewatch	V	700 m	MPC · JPL
647516	2008 UA_{77}	—	October 21, 2008	Kitt Peak	Spacewatch	·	1.1 km	MPC · JPL
647517	2008 UC_{79}	—	September 2, 2008	Kitt Peak	Spacewatch	·	1.4 km	MPC · JPL
647518	2008 UQ_{79}	—	September 23, 2008	Kitt Peak	Spacewatch	L4	6.5 km	MPC · JPL
647519	2008 UC_{83}	—	September 7, 2008	Mount Lemmon	Mount Lemmon Survey	·	1.2 km	MPC · JPL
647520	2008 UH_{83}	—	October 8, 2008	Catalina	CSS	·	930 m	MPC · JPL
647521	2008 UX_{87}	—	September 4, 2008	Kitt Peak	Spacewatch	·	990 m	MPC · JPL
647522	2008 UH_{89}	—	September 29, 2008	Kitt Peak	Spacewatch	·	1.7 km	MPC · JPL
647523	2008 UQ_{96}	—	October 24, 2008	Catalina	CSS	H	580 m	MPC · JPL
647524	2008 UE_{102}	—	September 22, 2008	Mount Lemmon	Mount Lemmon Survey	·	1.8 km	MPC · JPL
647525	2008 UV_{105}	—	September 23, 2008	Kitt Peak	Spacewatch	·	850 m	MPC · JPL
647526	2008 UA_{106}	—	September 20, 2008	Mount Lemmon	Mount Lemmon Survey	·	820 m	MPC · JPL
647527	2008 UE_{106}	—	October 8, 2008	Mount Lemmon	Mount Lemmon Survey	·	1.3 km	MPC · JPL
647528	2008 US_{107}	—	October 21, 2008	Mount Lemmon	Mount Lemmon Survey	·	1.6 km	MPC · JPL
647529	2008 UD_{108}	—	October 21, 2008	Kitt Peak	Spacewatch	·	1.7 km	MPC · JPL
647530	2008 UD_{118}	—	July 3, 2000	Kitt Peak	Spacewatch	·	970 m	MPC · JPL
647531	2008 UW_{119}	—	October 22, 2008	Kitt Peak	Spacewatch	V	620 m	MPC · JPL
647532	2008 UB_{125}	—	October 22, 2008	Kitt Peak	Spacewatch	·	820 m	MPC · JPL
647533	2008 UR_{127}	—	October 22, 2008	Kitt Peak	Spacewatch	PHO	770 m	MPC · JPL
647534	2008 UV_{128}	—	October 3, 2008	La Sagra	OAM	·	800 m	MPC · JPL
647535	2008 UL_{133}	—	September 23, 2008	Mount Lemmon	Mount Lemmon Survey	·	770 m	MPC · JPL
647536	2008 UX_{138}	—	October 23, 2008	Kitt Peak	Spacewatch	·	1.1 km	MPC · JPL
647537	2008 UQ_{150}	—	September 23, 2008	Kitt Peak	Spacewatch	·	1.4 km	MPC · JPL
647538	2008 UN_{151}	—	October 9, 2008	Mount Lemmon	Mount Lemmon Survey	·	1.0 km	MPC · JPL
647539	2008 UE_{157}	—	October 23, 2008	Mount Lemmon	Mount Lemmon Survey	NYS	760 m	MPC · JPL
647540	2008 UG_{160}	—	October 23, 2008	Kitt Peak	Spacewatch	PHO	930 m	MPC · JPL
647541	2008 UO_{161}	—	September 4, 2008	Kitt Peak	Spacewatch	·	1.2 km	MPC · JPL
647542	2008 UW_{163}	—	October 24, 2008	Kitt Peak	Spacewatch	AGN	1.2 km	MPC · JPL
647543	2008 UP_{165}	—	October 24, 2008	Kitt Peak	Spacewatch	·	1.4 km	MPC · JPL
647544	2008 UZ_{169}	—	September 23, 2008	Catalina	CSS	·	1.1 km	MPC · JPL
647545	2008 UH_{171}	—	October 24, 2008	Kitt Peak	Spacewatch	·	1.1 km	MPC · JPL
647546	2008 UN_{171}	—	April 25, 2006	Mount Lemmon	Mount Lemmon Survey	·	1.8 km	MPC · JPL
647547	2008 UC_{177}	—	September 24, 2008	Kitt Peak	Spacewatch	BRA	1.2 km	MPC · JPL
647548	2008 UK_{180}	—	September 19, 1998	Apache Point	SDSS	615	1.1 km	MPC · JPL
647549	2008 UZ_{185}	—	October 24, 2008	Kitt Peak	Spacewatch	MAS	590 m	MPC · JPL
647550	2008 UL_{188}	—	October 24, 2008	Kitt Peak	Spacewatch	·	1.2 km	MPC · JPL
647551	2008 UR_{209}	—	September 22, 2008	Kitt Peak	Spacewatch	SYL	3.0 km	MPC · JPL
647552	2008 UQ_{217}	—	October 25, 2008	Kitt Peak	Spacewatch	·	1.1 km	MPC · JPL
647553	2008 UE_{219}	—	October 25, 2008	Kitt Peak	Spacewatch	·	1.6 km	MPC · JPL
647554	2008 UZ_{219}	—	October 25, 2008	Kitt Peak	Spacewatch	·	980 m	MPC · JPL
647555	2008 UG_{221}	—	October 25, 2008	Kitt Peak	Spacewatch	V	540 m	MPC · JPL
647556	2008 UD_{223}	—	October 25, 2008	Kitt Peak	Spacewatch	AGN	910 m	MPC · JPL
647557	2008 UC_{229}	—	October 25, 2008	Catalina	CSS	EUN	1.2 km	MPC · JPL
647558	2008 UJ_{229}	—	October 25, 2008	Mount Lemmon	Mount Lemmon Survey	·	1.9 km	MPC · JPL
647559	2008 UJ_{234}	—	October 26, 2008	Mount Lemmon	Mount Lemmon Survey	V	510 m	MPC · JPL
647560	2008 UO_{234}	—	October 26, 2008	Kitt Peak	Spacewatch	·	1.8 km	MPC · JPL
647561	2008 UX_{235}	—	October 26, 2008	Mount Lemmon	Mount Lemmon Survey	·	720 m	MPC · JPL
647562	2008 UR_{242}	—	October 26, 2008	Kitt Peak	Spacewatch	·	2.2 km	MPC · JPL
647563	2008 UL_{243}	—	August 25, 2004	Kitt Peak	Spacewatch	V	510 m	MPC · JPL
647564	2008 UA_{246}	—	October 26, 2008	Mount Lemmon	Mount Lemmon Survey	EOS	1.2 km	MPC · JPL
647565	2008 UR_{246}	—	October 26, 2008	Mount Lemmon	Mount Lemmon Survey	BRA	1.3 km	MPC · JPL
647566	2008 UU_{247}	—	October 26, 2008	Kitt Peak	Spacewatch	·	680 m	MPC · JPL
647567	2008 UG_{253}	—	October 27, 2008	Mount Lemmon	Mount Lemmon Survey	L4	6.7 km	MPC · JPL
647568	2008 UT_{254}	—	September 22, 2008	Mount Lemmon	Mount Lemmon Survey	·	750 m	MPC · JPL
647569	2008 UM_{256}	—	October 27, 2008	Kitt Peak	Spacewatch	·	1.3 km	MPC · JPL
647570	2008 UV_{259}	—	October 27, 2008	Kitt Peak	Spacewatch	AST	1.6 km	MPC · JPL
647571	2008 UM_{267}	—	October 9, 2008	Mount Lemmon	Mount Lemmon Survey	·	1.6 km	MPC · JPL
647572	2008 UM_{268}	—	October 28, 2008	Kitt Peak	Spacewatch	·	780 m	MPC · JPL
647573	2008 UW_{271}	—	October 20, 2008	Kitt Peak	Spacewatch	·	950 m	MPC · JPL
647574	2008 UM_{278}	—	October 28, 2008	Mount Lemmon	Mount Lemmon Survey	KOR	1.1 km	MPC · JPL
647575	2008 UB_{279}	—	February 20, 2006	Kitt Peak	Spacewatch	MAS	550 m	MPC · JPL
647576	2008 UT_{279}	—	October 28, 2008	Mount Lemmon	Mount Lemmon Survey	KOR	900 m	MPC · JPL
647577	2008 UC_{283}	—	October 28, 2008	Mount Lemmon	Mount Lemmon Survey	·	830 m	MPC · JPL
647578	2008 UY_{283}	—	February 22, 2002	Palomar	NEAT	·	1.5 km	MPC · JPL
647579	2008 UA_{289}	—	October 21, 2008	Kitt Peak	Spacewatch	·	850 m	MPC · JPL
647580	2008 UV_{289}	—	October 28, 2008	Kitt Peak	Spacewatch	·	900 m	MPC · JPL
647581	2008 UE_{290}	—	September 29, 2008	Mount Lemmon	Mount Lemmon Survey	NYS	970 m	MPC · JPL
647582	2008 UN_{294}	—	October 29, 2008	Kitt Peak	Spacewatch	AGN	1.1 km	MPC · JPL
647583	2008 UG_{295}	—	December 19, 2004	Mount Lemmon	Mount Lemmon Survey	AGN	1.2 km	MPC · JPL
647584	2008 UG_{296}	—	October 29, 2008	Kitt Peak	Spacewatch	BRA	1.4 km	MPC · JPL
647585	2008 UM_{301}	—	October 20, 2008	Kitt Peak	Spacewatch	·	1.1 km	MPC · JPL
647586	2008 UO_{302}	—	October 16, 2003	Kitt Peak	Spacewatch	·	1.5 km	MPC · JPL
647587	2008 UH_{310}	—	October 5, 2008	La Sagra	OAM	·	1.9 km	MPC · JPL
647588	2008 UY_{316}	—	October 30, 2008	Mount Lemmon	Mount Lemmon Survey	·	1.7 km	MPC · JPL
647589	2008 UF_{319}	—	October 10, 2008	Mount Lemmon	Mount Lemmon Survey	·	1.8 km	MPC · JPL
647590	2008 UK_{319}	—	October 10, 2008	Mount Lemmon	Mount Lemmon Survey	V	580 m	MPC · JPL
647591	2008 UQ_{325}	—	October 21, 2008	Mount Lemmon	Mount Lemmon Survey	·	1.8 km	MPC · JPL
647592	2008 UO_{334}	—	October 27, 2008	Kitt Peak	Spacewatch	KOR	1.1 km	MPC · JPL
647593	2008 UT_{343}	—	October 23, 2008	Kitt Peak	Spacewatch	·	830 m	MPC · JPL
647594	2008 US_{349}	—	October 28, 2008	Kitt Peak	Spacewatch	NYS	1.1 km	MPC · JPL
647595	2008 UX_{349}	—	October 28, 2008	Kitt Peak	Spacewatch	·	1.2 km	MPC · JPL
647596	2008 UJ_{362}	—	October 24, 2008	Catalina	CSS	DOR	2.4 km	MPC · JPL
647597	2008 UQ_{365}	—	October 20, 2008	Mount Lemmon	Mount Lemmon Survey	EUN	1.0 km	MPC · JPL
647598	2008 UP_{367}	—	October 24, 2008	Catalina	CSS	·	1.2 km	MPC · JPL
647599	2008 UK_{371}	—	October 25, 2008	Mount Lemmon	Mount Lemmon Survey	·	1.6 km	MPC · JPL
647600	2008 US_{375}	—	October 20, 2003	Kitt Peak	Spacewatch	·	1.8 km	MPC · JPL

== 647601–647700 ==
back to top

Designation			Discovery			Properties		Ref
Permanent	Provisional	Named after	Date	Site	Discoverer(s)	Category	Diam.	Ref
647601	2008 UU_{376}	—	October 29, 2008	Kitt Peak	Spacewatch	V	600 m	MPC · JPL
647602	2008 UX_{376}	—	October 28, 2008	Kitt Peak	Spacewatch	EUN	1.2 km	MPC · JPL
647603	2008 UP_{377}	—	October 27, 2008	Kitt Peak	Spacewatch	·	1.5 km	MPC · JPL
647604	2008 UA_{379}	—	March 15, 2016	Mount Lemmon	Mount Lemmon Survey	·	1.6 km	MPC · JPL
647605	2008 UL_{379}	—	November 27, 2013	Haleakala	Pan-STARRS 1	HOF	2.1 km	MPC · JPL
647606	2008 US_{379}	—	December 22, 2012	Haleakala	Pan-STARRS 1	PHO	950 m	MPC · JPL
647607	2008 UB_{380}	—	July 19, 2015	Haleakala	Pan-STARRS 1	·	960 m	MPC · JPL
647608	2008 UL_{380}	—	October 27, 2008	Kitt Peak	Spacewatch	·	970 m	MPC · JPL
647609	2008 UG_{381}	—	October 1, 2015	Mount Lemmon	Mount Lemmon Survey	·	1.1 km	MPC · JPL
647610	2008 UW_{381}	—	October 17, 2008	Kitt Peak	Spacewatch	·	820 m	MPC · JPL
647611	2008 UC_{382}	—	February 17, 2010	Kitt Peak	Spacewatch	·	740 m	MPC · JPL
647612	2008 UO_{382}	—	February 14, 2010	Kitt Peak	Spacewatch	·	890 m	MPC · JPL
647613	2008 UR_{383}	—	May 22, 2011	Mount Lemmon	Mount Lemmon Survey	·	840 m	MPC · JPL
647614	2008 UH_{385}	—	June 8, 2016	Haleakala	Pan-STARRS 1	·	1.3 km	MPC · JPL
647615	2008 UW_{387}	—	October 20, 2008	Kitt Peak	Spacewatch	·	920 m	MPC · JPL
647616	2008 UG_{388}	—	October 24, 2013	Mount Lemmon	Mount Lemmon Survey	·	1.9 km	MPC · JPL
647617	2008 UL_{389}	—	October 27, 2008	Kitt Peak	Spacewatch	·	770 m	MPC · JPL
647618	2008 UV_{389}	—	October 29, 2008	Mount Lemmon	Mount Lemmon Survey	PHO	650 m	MPC · JPL
647619	2008 UE_{390}	—	October 3, 2013	Haleakala	Pan-STARRS 1	·	1.6 km	MPC · JPL
647620	2008 UT_{390}	—	October 2, 2013	Kitt Peak	Spacewatch	·	2.1 km	MPC · JPL
647621	2008 UR_{392}	—	December 8, 2012	Mount Lemmon	Mount Lemmon Survey	·	1.1 km	MPC · JPL
647622	2008 UB_{393}	—	July 25, 2015	Haleakala	Pan-STARRS 1	·	820 m	MPC · JPL
647623	2008 UH_{393}	—	October 23, 2008	Kitt Peak	Spacewatch	·	1.4 km	MPC · JPL
647624	2008 US_{393}	—	July 29, 2012	Haleakala	Pan-STARRS 1	·	1.7 km	MPC · JPL
647625	2008 UO_{396}	—	December 27, 2011	Mount Lemmon	Mount Lemmon Survey	L4	7.1 km	MPC · JPL
647626	2008 UB_{397}	—	September 19, 2017	Haleakala	Pan-STARRS 1	·	1.4 km	MPC · JPL
647627	2008 UC_{397}	—	February 16, 2015	Haleakala	Pan-STARRS 1	L4	6.3 km	MPC · JPL
647628	2008 UL_{397}	—	December 13, 2015	Haleakala	Pan-STARRS 1	ULA	3.4 km	MPC · JPL
647629	2008 UH_{398}	—	April 10, 2014	Haleakala	Pan-STARRS 1	·	920 m	MPC · JPL
647630	2008 UJ_{400}	—	October 26, 2008	Kitt Peak	Spacewatch	·	950 m	MPC · JPL
647631	2008 UQ_{400}	—	October 3, 2008	Mount Lemmon	Mount Lemmon Survey	L4	6.9 km	MPC · JPL
647632	2008 UF_{402}	—	October 10, 2015	Haleakala	Pan-STARRS 1	V	420 m	MPC · JPL
647633	2008 UW_{402}	—	October 29, 2008	Mount Lemmon	Mount Lemmon Survey	·	1.9 km	MPC · JPL
647634	2008 UQ_{403}	—	October 31, 2008	Kitt Peak	Spacewatch	·	1.4 km	MPC · JPL
647635	2008 UT_{405}	—	October 24, 2008	Mount Lemmon	Mount Lemmon Survey	HOF	2.0 km	MPC · JPL
647636	2008 UZ_{405}	—	October 27, 2008	Mount Lemmon	Mount Lemmon Survey	·	1.5 km	MPC · JPL
647637	2008 UE_{406}	—	October 24, 2008	Kitt Peak	Spacewatch	·	1.6 km	MPC · JPL
647638	2008 UB_{410}	—	October 21, 2008	Mount Lemmon	Mount Lemmon Survey	·	1.5 km	MPC · JPL
647639	2008 UG_{410}	—	October 28, 2008	Kitt Peak	Spacewatch	KOR	1.2 km	MPC · JPL
647640	2008 UO_{411}	—	October 24, 2008	Mount Lemmon	Mount Lemmon Survey	·	1.4 km	MPC · JPL
647641	2008 UG_{413}	—	October 23, 2008	Kitt Peak	Spacewatch	·	1.6 km	MPC · JPL
647642	2008 UF_{414}	—	October 29, 2008	Mount Lemmon	Mount Lemmon Survey	·	1.7 km	MPC · JPL
647643	2008 UT_{417}	—	October 29, 2008	Kitt Peak	Spacewatch	·	630 m	MPC · JPL
647644	2008 UL_{420}	—	October 29, 2008	Mount Lemmon	Mount Lemmon Survey	·	1.1 km	MPC · JPL
647645	2008 UM_{422}	—	October 20, 2008	Mount Lemmon	Mount Lemmon Survey	HOF	1.9 km	MPC · JPL
647646	2008 VM_{6}	—	November 1, 2008	Kitt Peak	Spacewatch	·	1.9 km	MPC · JPL
647647	2008 VP_{6}	—	November 1, 2008	Mount Lemmon	Mount Lemmon Survey	·	1.3 km	MPC · JPL
647648	2008 VJ_{9}	—	November 2, 2008	Mount Lemmon	Mount Lemmon Survey	·	1.4 km	MPC · JPL
647649	2008 VQ_{10}	—	October 6, 2008	Mount Lemmon	Mount Lemmon Survey	HOF	2.5 km	MPC · JPL
647650	2008 VF_{11}	—	March 15, 2007	Mount Lemmon	Mount Lemmon Survey	·	720 m	MPC · JPL
647651	2008 VP_{11}	—	November 2, 2008	Mount Lemmon	Mount Lemmon Survey	·	980 m	MPC · JPL
647652	2008 VN_{17}	—	November 1, 2008	Kitt Peak	Spacewatch	KOR	1.2 km	MPC · JPL
647653	2008 VN_{20}	—	November 1, 2008	Mount Lemmon	Mount Lemmon Survey	·	1.1 km	MPC · JPL
647654	2008 VE_{21}	—	November 1, 2008	Mount Lemmon	Mount Lemmon Survey	HOF	2.2 km	MPC · JPL
647655	2008 VN_{23}	—	November 1, 2008	Kitt Peak	Spacewatch	PHO	950 m	MPC · JPL
647656	2008 VM_{30}	—	September 25, 2008	Mount Lemmon	Mount Lemmon Survey	NYS	710 m	MPC · JPL
647657	2008 VL_{33}	—	September 23, 2008	Mount Lemmon	Mount Lemmon Survey	·	1.2 km	MPC · JPL
647658	2008 VQ_{35}	—	October 25, 2008	Kitt Peak	Spacewatch	·	1.7 km	MPC · JPL
647659	2008 VM_{37}	—	December 12, 2004	Kitt Peak	Spacewatch	·	1.8 km	MPC · JPL
647660	2008 VZ_{37}	—	November 2, 2008	Mount Lemmon	Mount Lemmon Survey	·	1.6 km	MPC · JPL
647661	2008 VF_{44}	—	October 22, 2008	Kitt Peak	Spacewatch	·	1.6 km	MPC · JPL
647662	2008 VA_{47}	—	October 24, 2008	Kitt Peak	Spacewatch	MAS	610 m	MPC · JPL
647663	2008 VR_{52}	—	October 8, 2008	Mount Lemmon	Mount Lemmon Survey	·	840 m	MPC · JPL
647664	2008 VY_{53}	—	October 24, 2008	Kitt Peak	Spacewatch	·	1.3 km	MPC · JPL
647665	2008 VT_{58}	—	October 3, 2008	Kitt Peak	Spacewatch	MAS	470 m	MPC · JPL
647666	2008 VM_{59}	—	October 19, 2003	Kitt Peak	Spacewatch	·	2.9 km	MPC · JPL
647667	2008 VW_{65}	—	November 1, 2008	Kitt Peak	Spacewatch	·	1.1 km	MPC · JPL
647668	2008 VT_{69}	—	November 9, 2008	Mount Lemmon	Mount Lemmon Survey	·	1.8 km	MPC · JPL
647669	2008 VO_{70}	—	November 7, 2008	Mount Lemmon	Mount Lemmon Survey	·	1.6 km	MPC · JPL
647670	2008 VE_{73}	—	November 2, 2008	Mount Lemmon	Mount Lemmon Survey	·	1.1 km	MPC · JPL
647671	2008 VV_{80}	—	September 29, 2008	Catalina	CSS	·	2.1 km	MPC · JPL
647672	2008 VL_{82}	—	November 3, 2008	Kitt Peak	Spacewatch	·	1.1 km	MPC · JPL
647673	2008 VA_{83}	—	November 2, 2008	Mount Lemmon	Mount Lemmon Survey	TIR	3.3 km	MPC · JPL
647674	2008 VS_{83}	—	September 6, 2013	Mount Lemmon	Mount Lemmon Survey	·	1.8 km	MPC · JPL
647675	2008 VG_{85}	—	August 5, 2003	Kitt Peak	Spacewatch	·	1.7 km	MPC · JPL
647676	2008 VR_{85}	—	November 6, 2008	Mount Lemmon	Mount Lemmon Survey	3:2	4.1 km	MPC · JPL
647677	2008 VC_{86}	—	November 27, 2013	Haleakala	Pan-STARRS 1	·	2.0 km	MPC · JPL
647678	2008 VT_{86}	—	June 25, 2015	Haleakala	Pan-STARRS 1	·	860 m	MPC · JPL
647679	2008 VC_{88}	—	November 6, 2008	Mount Lemmon	Mount Lemmon Survey	·	1.0 km	MPC · JPL
647680	2008 VL_{91}	—	September 29, 2008	Kitt Peak	Spacewatch	·	950 m	MPC · JPL
647681	2008 VR_{92}	—	November 7, 2008	Mount Lemmon	Mount Lemmon Survey	KOR	1.1 km	MPC · JPL
647682	2008 VX_{92}	—	January 17, 2013	Haleakala	Pan-STARRS 1	·	830 m	MPC · JPL
647683	2008 VC_{93}	—	September 2, 2013	Mount Lemmon	Mount Lemmon Survey	·	1.7 km	MPC · JPL
647684	2008 VC_{94}	—	October 12, 2013	Mount Lemmon	Mount Lemmon Survey	·	2.0 km	MPC · JPL
647685	2008 VB_{95}	—	November 8, 2008	Mount Lemmon	Mount Lemmon Survey	·	1.7 km	MPC · JPL
647686	2008 VX_{95}	—	November 1, 2008	Mount Lemmon	Mount Lemmon Survey	·	1.7 km	MPC · JPL
647687	2008 VF_{97}	—	November 28, 2014	Haleakala	Pan-STARRS 1	·	1.8 km	MPC · JPL
647688	2008 VQ_{98}	—	November 6, 2008	Mount Lemmon	Mount Lemmon Survey	·	1.4 km	MPC · JPL
647689	2008 VB_{99}	—	November 7, 2008	Mount Lemmon	Mount Lemmon Survey	·	1.6 km	MPC · JPL
647690	2008 VQ_{99}	—	November 3, 2008	Mount Lemmon	Mount Lemmon Survey	·	1.5 km	MPC · JPL
647691	2008 VJ_{100}	—	November 2, 2008	Mount Lemmon	Mount Lemmon Survey	·	1.6 km	MPC · JPL
647692	2008 VQ_{100}	—	November 7, 2008	Mount Lemmon	Mount Lemmon Survey	·	740 m	MPC · JPL
647693	2008 VM_{103}	—	November 8, 2008	Kitt Peak	Spacewatch	V	660 m	MPC · JPL
647694	2008 VW_{103}	—	November 2, 2008	Mount Lemmon	Mount Lemmon Survey	·	1.8 km	MPC · JPL
647695	2008 WP_{4}	—	October 29, 2008	Kitt Peak	Spacewatch	·	1.4 km	MPC · JPL
647696	2008 WX_{5}	—	October 3, 2008	Kitt Peak	Spacewatch	MIS	2.4 km	MPC · JPL
647697	2008 WX_{6}	—	October 27, 2008	Kitt Peak	Spacewatch	·	1.5 km	MPC · JPL
647698	2008 WC_{12}	—	September 27, 2008	Mount Lemmon	Mount Lemmon Survey	·	610 m	MPC · JPL
647699	2008 WQ_{14}	—	October 7, 2008	Kitt Peak	Spacewatch	·	960 m	MPC · JPL
647700	2008 WV_{14}	—	October 24, 2008	Kitt Peak	Spacewatch	AGN	1.1 km	MPC · JPL

== 647701–647800 ==
back to top

Designation			Discovery			Properties		Ref
Permanent	Provisional	Named after	Date	Site	Discoverer(s)	Category	Diam.	Ref
647701	2008 WF_{15}	—	September 29, 2008	Kitt Peak	Spacewatch	·	1.3 km	MPC · JPL
647702	2008 WA_{19}	—	October 28, 2008	Mount Lemmon	Mount Lemmon Survey	·	1.4 km	MPC · JPL
647703	2008 WT_{19}	—	November 17, 2008	Kitt Peak	Spacewatch	AGN	1.0 km	MPC · JPL
647704	2008 WH_{21}	—	November 17, 2008	Kitt Peak	Spacewatch	·	1.5 km	MPC · JPL
647705	2008 WE_{24}	—	November 18, 2008	Kitt Peak	Spacewatch	KOR	1.1 km	MPC · JPL
647706	2008 WB_{26}	—	October 10, 2008	Mount Lemmon	Mount Lemmon Survey	·	760 m	MPC · JPL
647707	2008 WA_{28}	—	October 28, 2008	Kitt Peak	Spacewatch	·	930 m	MPC · JPL
647708	2008 WG_{33}	—	November 21, 2008	Pla D'Arguines	R. Ferrando, Ferrando, M.	H	420 m	MPC · JPL
647709	2008 WE_{35}	—	November 17, 2008	Kitt Peak	Spacewatch	·	1.2 km	MPC · JPL
647710	2008 WY_{35}	—	October 28, 2008	Kitt Peak	Spacewatch	·	1.0 km	MPC · JPL
647711	2008 WT_{39}	—	September 27, 2008	Mount Lemmon	Mount Lemmon Survey	·	1.9 km	MPC · JPL
647712	2008 WP_{40}	—	November 17, 2008	Kitt Peak	Spacewatch	MAS	560 m	MPC · JPL
647713	2008 WF_{44}	—	November 17, 2008	Kitt Peak	Spacewatch	KOR	1.2 km	MPC · JPL
647714	2008 WK_{44}	—	November 9, 2008	Kitt Peak	Spacewatch	·	840 m	MPC · JPL
647715	2008 WX_{45}	—	November 17, 2008	Kitt Peak	Spacewatch	·	1.5 km	MPC · JPL
647716	2008 WE_{49}	—	October 21, 2008	Kitt Peak	Spacewatch	PHO	750 m	MPC · JPL
647717	2008 WB_{56}	—	March 26, 2007	Mount Lemmon	Mount Lemmon Survey	·	980 m	MPC · JPL
647718	2008 WZ_{57}	—	November 20, 2008	Mount Lemmon	Mount Lemmon Survey	V	520 m	MPC · JPL
647719	2008 WN_{64}	—	October 2, 2008	Kitt Peak	Spacewatch	·	840 m	MPC · JPL
647720	2008 WC_{65}	—	October 9, 2008	Kitt Peak	Spacewatch	L4	6.2 km	MPC · JPL
647721	2008 WQ_{70}	—	November 18, 2008	Kitt Peak	Spacewatch	NYS	1.3 km	MPC · JPL
647722	2008 WT_{74}	—	November 8, 2008	Mount Lemmon	Mount Lemmon Survey	KOR	1.1 km	MPC · JPL
647723	2008 WO_{75}	—	November 20, 2003	Kitt Peak	Spacewatch	·	1.6 km	MPC · JPL
647724	2008 WX_{76}	—	January 22, 2002	Kitt Peak	Spacewatch	NYS	810 m	MPC · JPL
647725	2008 WW_{77}	—	November 7, 2008	Mount Lemmon	Mount Lemmon Survey	·	1.1 km	MPC · JPL
647726	2008 WB_{80}	—	November 2, 2008	Mount Lemmon	Mount Lemmon Survey	·	1.8 km	MPC · JPL
647727	2008 WP_{80}	—	November 20, 2008	Kitt Peak	Spacewatch	·	830 m	MPC · JPL
647728	2008 WU_{82}	—	November 20, 2008	Kitt Peak	Spacewatch	PHO	780 m	MPC · JPL
647729	2008 WU_{83}	—	November 20, 2008	Kitt Peak	Spacewatch	·	990 m	MPC · JPL
647730	2008 WC_{84}	—	November 20, 2008	Kitt Peak	Spacewatch	·	2.4 km	MPC · JPL
647731	2008 WA_{85}	—	November 20, 2008	Kitt Peak	Spacewatch	·	960 m	MPC · JPL
647732	2008 WV_{85}	—	November 20, 2008	Kitt Peak	Spacewatch	·	1.3 km	MPC · JPL
647733	2008 WA_{86}	—	November 20, 2008	Kitt Peak	Spacewatch	·	880 m	MPC · JPL
647734	2008 WG_{86}	—	May 26, 2007	Mount Lemmon	Mount Lemmon Survey	V	670 m	MPC · JPL
647735	2008 WL_{88}	—	November 9, 2008	Kitt Peak	Spacewatch	·	980 m	MPC · JPL
647736	2008 WT_{89}	—	November 22, 2008	Kitt Peak	Spacewatch	H	470 m	MPC · JPL
647737	2008 WX_{91}	—	November 26, 2008	La Sagra	OAM	H	390 m	MPC · JPL
647738	2008 WA_{101}	—	November 24, 2008	Mount Lemmon	Mount Lemmon Survey	·	2.2 km	MPC · JPL
647739	2008 WO_{103}	—	November 21, 2008	Kitt Peak	Spacewatch	·	1.1 km	MPC · JPL
647740	2008 WX_{108}	—	September 4, 2007	Mount Lemmon	Mount Lemmon Survey	KOR	1.3 km	MPC · JPL
647741	2008 WJ_{109}	—	October 30, 2008	Kitt Peak	Spacewatch	·	1.5 km	MPC · JPL
647742	2008 WR_{114}	—	October 22, 2008	Kitt Peak	Spacewatch	·	1.8 km	MPC · JPL
647743	2008 WB_{116}	—	December 3, 2005	Mauna Kea	A. Boattini	·	1.4 km	MPC · JPL
647744	2008 WX_{121}	—	November 9, 2008	Kitt Peak	Spacewatch	·	1.2 km	MPC · JPL
647745	2008 WQ_{129}	—	November 17, 2008	Kitt Peak	Spacewatch	·	990 m	MPC · JPL
647746	2008 WO_{134}	—	November 22, 2008	Mount Lemmon	Mount Lemmon Survey	H	410 m	MPC · JPL
647747	2008 WY_{142}	—	September 5, 2007	Siding Spring	K. Sárneczky, L. Kiss	KOR	1.2 km	MPC · JPL
647748	2008 WB_{143}	—	November 19, 2008	Mount Lemmon	Mount Lemmon Survey	·	1.1 km	MPC · JPL
647749	2008 WN_{143}	—	October 31, 2008	Kitt Peak	Spacewatch	·	1.8 km	MPC · JPL
647750	2008 WW_{144}	—	April 20, 2010	Kitt Peak	Spacewatch	·	860 m	MPC · JPL
647751	2008 WX_{144}	—	November 19, 2008	Kitt Peak	Spacewatch	·	1.2 km	MPC · JPL
647752	2008 WZ_{144}	—	January 17, 2013	Haleakala	Pan-STARRS 1	V	580 m	MPC · JPL
647753	2008 WA_{145}	—	March 21, 2015	Haleakala	Pan-STARRS 1	AST	1.4 km	MPC · JPL
647754	2008 WH_{145}	—	November 21, 2008	Mount Lemmon	Mount Lemmon Survey	·	890 m	MPC · JPL
647755	2008 WU_{145}	—	November 21, 2008	Mount Lemmon	Mount Lemmon Survey	AGN	1.1 km	MPC · JPL
647756	2008 WZ_{145}	—	March 26, 2006	Kitt Peak	Spacewatch	·	2.9 km	MPC · JPL
647757	2008 WC_{146}	—	November 9, 2008	Kitt Peak	Spacewatch	·	870 m	MPC · JPL
647758	2008 WK_{146}	—	October 10, 2015	Haleakala	Pan-STARRS 1	V	510 m	MPC · JPL
647759	2008 WN_{147}	—	November 20, 2008	Kitt Peak	Spacewatch	PHO	880 m	MPC · JPL
647760	2008 WT_{147}	—	November 20, 2008	Kitt Peak	Spacewatch	ERI	1.2 km	MPC · JPL
647761	2008 WY_{147}	—	November 24, 2008	Mount Lemmon	Mount Lemmon Survey	·	1.3 km	MPC · JPL
647762	2008 WQ_{148}	—	November 27, 2013	Haleakala	Pan-STARRS 1	·	1.5 km	MPC · JPL
647763	2008 WA_{149}	—	January 14, 2013	Mount Lemmon	Mount Lemmon Survey	·	1.1 km	MPC · JPL
647764	2008 WD_{150}	—	November 20, 2008	Kitt Peak	Spacewatch	·	1.3 km	MPC · JPL
647765	2008 WG_{150}	—	November 19, 2008	Kitt Peak	Spacewatch	·	1.0 km	MPC · JPL
647766	2008 WL_{150}	—	October 31, 2008	Kitt Peak	Spacewatch	V	500 m	MPC · JPL
647767	2008 WW_{150}	—	November 20, 2008	Kitt Peak	Spacewatch	·	1.4 km	MPC · JPL
647768	2008 WN_{151}	—	January 20, 2015	Haleakala	Pan-STARRS 1	EOS	1.4 km	MPC · JPL
647769	2008 WO_{152}	—	November 18, 2008	Kitt Peak	Spacewatch	·	1.2 km	MPC · JPL
647770	2008 WE_{153}	—	November 7, 2013	Kitt Peak	Spacewatch	KOR	1.0 km	MPC · JPL
647771	2008 WC_{155}	—	April 23, 2014	Haleakala	Pan-STARRS 1	·	750 m	MPC · JPL
647772	2008 WH_{156}	—	November 21, 2008	Mount Lemmon	Mount Lemmon Survey	KOR	1.1 km	MPC · JPL
647773	2008 WX_{156}	—	November 19, 2008	Mount Lemmon	Mount Lemmon Survey	·	1.9 km	MPC · JPL
647774	2008 WC_{157}	—	November 20, 2008	Mount Lemmon	Mount Lemmon Survey	MAS	630 m	MPC · JPL
647775	2008 WG_{157}	—	November 21, 2008	Kitt Peak	Spacewatch	·	1.5 km	MPC · JPL
647776	2008 WC_{158}	—	November 21, 2008	Kitt Peak	Spacewatch	·	1.6 km	MPC · JPL
647777	2008 WD_{158}	—	November 17, 2008	Kitt Peak	Spacewatch	·	2.1 km	MPC · JPL
647778	2008 WH_{162}	—	November 23, 2008	Kitt Peak	Spacewatch	T_{j} (2.96) · 3:2	3.9 km	MPC · JPL
647779 Ansari	2008 XF_{7}	Ansari	November 29, 2008	Zelenchukskaya Station	T. V. Krjačko, B. Satovski	EUN	1.2 km	MPC · JPL
647780	2008 XH_{8}	—	December 1, 2008	Catalina	CSS	·	1 km	MPC · JPL
647781	2008 XJ_{9}	—	March 25, 2007	Mount Lemmon	Mount Lemmon Survey	JUN	1.0 km	MPC · JPL
647782	2008 XM_{10}	—	December 1, 2008	Mount Lemmon	Mount Lemmon Survey	·	1.5 km	MPC · JPL
647783	2008 XY_{10}	—	November 7, 2008	Mount Lemmon	Mount Lemmon Survey	·	1.5 km	MPC · JPL
647784	2008 XC_{17}	—	December 1, 2008	Kitt Peak	Spacewatch	·	810 m	MPC · JPL
647785	2008 XJ_{18}	—	December 1, 2008	Kitt Peak	Spacewatch	·	1.3 km	MPC · JPL
647786	2008 XZ_{18}	—	December 1, 2008	Mount Lemmon	Mount Lemmon Survey	·	510 m	MPC · JPL
647787	2008 XG_{19}	—	September 5, 1999	Kitt Peak	Spacewatch	3:2 · SHU	4.3 km	MPC · JPL
647788	2008 XR_{22}	—	November 6, 2008	Kitt Peak	Spacewatch	·	1.7 km	MPC · JPL
647789	2008 XU_{26}	—	October 27, 2008	Kitt Peak	Spacewatch	·	1.7 km	MPC · JPL
647790	2008 XW_{26}	—	December 4, 2008	Mount Lemmon	Mount Lemmon Survey	·	890 m	MPC · JPL
647791	2008 XZ_{39}	—	December 2, 2008	Kitt Peak	Spacewatch	·	1.1 km	MPC · JPL
647792	2008 XE_{41}	—	December 2, 2008	Kitt Peak	Spacewatch	·	1.0 km	MPC · JPL
647793	2008 XZ_{50}	—	December 2, 2008	Mount Lemmon	Mount Lemmon Survey	·	2.0 km	MPC · JPL
647794	2008 XD_{58}	—	December 1, 2008	Kitt Peak	Spacewatch	·	1.0 km	MPC · JPL
647795	2008 XJ_{58}	—	August 14, 2012	Haleakala	Pan-STARRS 1	·	1.5 km	MPC · JPL
647796	2008 XY_{58}	—	March 18, 2010	Kitt Peak	Spacewatch	V	530 m	MPC · JPL
647797	2008 XJ_{59}	—	December 2, 2008	Kitt Peak	Spacewatch	·	860 m	MPC · JPL
647798	2008 XG_{61}	—	January 9, 2013	Kitt Peak	Spacewatch	·	1.1 km	MPC · JPL
647799	2008 XQ_{61}	—	November 14, 2013	Mount Lemmon	Mount Lemmon Survey	·	1.9 km	MPC · JPL
647800	2008 XY_{61}	—	January 22, 2013	Mount Lemmon	Mount Lemmon Survey	V	510 m	MPC · JPL

== 647801–647900 ==
back to top

Designation			Discovery			Properties		Ref
Permanent	Provisional	Named after	Date	Site	Discoverer(s)	Category	Diam.	Ref
647801	2008 XF_{62}	—	November 24, 2008	Kitt Peak	Spacewatch	·	1.5 km	MPC · JPL
647802	2008 XP_{62}	—	February 20, 2015	Haleakala	Pan-STARRS 1	EOS	1.5 km	MPC · JPL
647803	2008 XZ_{62}	—	December 3, 2008	Mount Lemmon	Mount Lemmon Survey	·	1.4 km	MPC · JPL
647804	2008 XN_{63}	—	December 4, 2008	Kitt Peak	Spacewatch	TEL	1.0 km	MPC · JPL
647805	2008 XF_{64}	—	June 11, 2015	Haleakala	Pan-STARRS 1	·	1.1 km	MPC · JPL
647806	2008 XR_{64}	—	December 2, 2008	Kitt Peak	Spacewatch	NYS	940 m	MPC · JPL
647807	2008 XP_{66}	—	December 1, 2008	Mount Lemmon	Mount Lemmon Survey	H	360 m	MPC · JPL
647808	2008 XS_{66}	—	December 6, 2008	Kitt Peak	Spacewatch	·	1.5 km	MPC · JPL
647809	2008 XC_{67}	—	December 2, 2008	Mount Lemmon	Mount Lemmon Survey	·	1.8 km	MPC · JPL
647810	2008 XG_{68}	—	December 1, 2008	Kitt Peak	Spacewatch	·	980 m	MPC · JPL
647811	2008 YL	—	December 19, 2008	Calar Alto	F. Hormuth	MAS	580 m	MPC · JPL
647812	2008 YD_{5}	—	December 22, 2008	Piszkéstető	K. Sárneczky	·	1.4 km	MPC · JPL
647813	2008 YQ_{6}	—	December 22, 2008	Dauban	C. Rinner, Kugel, F.	·	1.8 km	MPC · JPL
647814	2008 YW_{6}	—	December 23, 2008	Dauban	C. Rinner, Kugel, F.	·	1.7 km	MPC · JPL
647815	2008 YM_{7}	—	December 20, 2008	La Sagra	OAM	H	570 m	MPC · JPL
647816	2008 YL_{8}	—	November 20, 2008	Mount Lemmon	Mount Lemmon Survey	·	890 m	MPC · JPL
647817	2008 YV_{11}	—	November 19, 2008	Mount Lemmon	Mount Lemmon Survey	·	1.1 km	MPC · JPL
647818	2008 YC_{12}	—	December 4, 2008	Kitt Peak	Spacewatch	·	1.5 km	MPC · JPL
647819	2008 YW_{15}	—	December 21, 2008	Mount Lemmon	Mount Lemmon Survey	·	1.7 km	MPC · JPL
647820	2008 YA_{16}	—	December 21, 2008	Mount Lemmon	Mount Lemmon Survey	TEL	1.2 km	MPC · JPL
647821	2008 YY_{16}	—	December 21, 2008	Mount Lemmon	Mount Lemmon Survey	·	1.6 km	MPC · JPL
647822	2008 YH_{18}	—	December 21, 2008	Kitt Peak	Spacewatch	·	2.4 km	MPC · JPL
647823	2008 YX_{19}	—	December 21, 2008	Mount Lemmon	Mount Lemmon Survey	·	2.4 km	MPC · JPL
647824	2008 YN_{22}	—	December 21, 2008	Mount Lemmon	Mount Lemmon Survey	·	1.7 km	MPC · JPL
647825	2008 YY_{30}	—	December 25, 2008	Bergisch Gladbach	W. Bickel	·	1.9 km	MPC · JPL
647826	2008 YR_{34}	—	January 2, 2009	Kitt Peak	Spacewatch	·	1.2 km	MPC · JPL
647827	2008 YA_{35}	—	December 22, 2008	Kitt Peak	Spacewatch	·	1.5 km	MPC · JPL
647828	2008 YG_{36}	—	December 22, 2008	Kitt Peak	Spacewatch	·	1.6 km	MPC · JPL
647829	2008 YZ_{39}	—	December 29, 2008	Kitt Peak	Spacewatch	·	1.8 km	MPC · JPL
647830	2008 YN_{43}	—	November 6, 2008	Mount Lemmon	Mount Lemmon Survey	·	960 m	MPC · JPL
647831	2008 YB_{46}	—	December 29, 2008	Mount Lemmon	Mount Lemmon Survey	·	1.1 km	MPC · JPL
647832	2008 YR_{46}	—	September 9, 2007	Kitt Peak	Spacewatch	V	640 m	MPC · JPL
647833	2008 YX_{46}	—	December 29, 2008	Mount Lemmon	Mount Lemmon Survey	BRA	1.5 km	MPC · JPL
647834	2008 YF_{47}	—	December 29, 2008	Mount Lemmon	Mount Lemmon Survey	·	1.4 km	MPC · JPL
647835	2008 YA_{50}	—	December 29, 2008	Mount Lemmon	Mount Lemmon Survey	H	410 m	MPC · JPL
647836	2008 YZ_{51}	—	December 29, 2008	Mount Lemmon	Mount Lemmon Survey	EOS	1.7 km	MPC · JPL
647837	2008 YG_{56}	—	December 30, 2008	Kitt Peak	Spacewatch	·	1.3 km	MPC · JPL
647838	2008 YL_{57}	—	December 30, 2008	Kitt Peak	Spacewatch	·	1.7 km	MPC · JPL
647839	2008 YB_{58}	—	December 30, 2008	Kitt Peak	Spacewatch	·	990 m	MPC · JPL
647840	2008 YH_{60}	—	December 30, 2008	Mount Lemmon	Mount Lemmon Survey	·	1.1 km	MPC · JPL
647841	2008 YN_{62}	—	December 30, 2008	Mount Lemmon	Mount Lemmon Survey	PHO	1.0 km	MPC · JPL
647842	2008 YF_{64}	—	December 30, 2008	Mount Lemmon	Mount Lemmon Survey	·	1.5 km	MPC · JPL
647843	2008 YH_{69}	—	April 28, 2003	Kitt Peak	Spacewatch	·	740 m	MPC · JPL
647844	2008 YJ_{70}	—	December 29, 2008	Mount Lemmon	Mount Lemmon Survey	EOS	1.5 km	MPC · JPL
647845	2008 YM_{71}	—	December 30, 2008	Kitt Peak	Spacewatch	·	930 m	MPC · JPL
647846	2008 YP_{71}	—	December 30, 2008	Kitt Peak	Spacewatch	·	2.0 km	MPC · JPL
647847	2008 YB_{74}	—	December 30, 2008	Kitt Peak	Spacewatch	EOS	2.0 km	MPC · JPL
647848	2008 YQ_{74}	—	December 30, 2008	Kitt Peak	Spacewatch	V	560 m	MPC · JPL
647849	2008 YC_{77}	—	December 30, 2008	Mount Lemmon	Mount Lemmon Survey	·	1.8 km	MPC · JPL
647850	2008 YD_{79}	—	December 30, 2008	Mount Lemmon	Mount Lemmon Survey	·	1.4 km	MPC · JPL
647851	2008 YE_{85}	—	December 29, 2008	Kitt Peak	Spacewatch	·	1.6 km	MPC · JPL
647852	2008 YT_{86}	—	November 24, 2008	Kitt Peak	Spacewatch	·	1.6 km	MPC · JPL
647853	2008 YB_{89}	—	December 29, 2008	Kitt Peak	Spacewatch	MAS	580 m	MPC · JPL
647854	2008 YK_{89}	—	November 8, 2008	Mount Lemmon	Mount Lemmon Survey	·	1.2 km	MPC · JPL
647855	2008 YM_{90}	—	September 11, 2007	Mount Lemmon	Mount Lemmon Survey	·	1.5 km	MPC · JPL
647856	2008 YV_{91}	—	December 29, 2008	Kitt Peak	Spacewatch	EOS	1.6 km	MPC · JPL
647857	2008 YQ_{95}	—	December 29, 2008	Kitt Peak	Spacewatch	·	2.0 km	MPC · JPL
647858	2008 YX_{95}	—	December 29, 2008	Kitt Peak	Spacewatch	MAS	560 m	MPC · JPL
647859	2008 YH_{97}	—	December 29, 2008	Mount Lemmon	Mount Lemmon Survey	EOS	1.3 km	MPC · JPL
647860	2008 YP_{97}	—	December 29, 2008	Mount Lemmon	Mount Lemmon Survey	MAS	600 m	MPC · JPL
647861	2008 YW_{98}	—	December 29, 2008	Kitt Peak	Spacewatch	·	1.2 km	MPC · JPL
647862	2008 YN_{103}	—	December 21, 2008	Mount Lemmon	Mount Lemmon Survey	·	2.0 km	MPC · JPL
647863	2008 YQ_{103}	—	November 21, 2008	Mount Lemmon	Mount Lemmon Survey	MAS	630 m	MPC · JPL
647864	2008 YR_{104}	—	December 29, 2008	Kitt Peak	Spacewatch	·	1.8 km	MPC · JPL
647865	2008 YN_{109}	—	October 11, 2006	Kitt Peak	Spacewatch	·	3.2 km	MPC · JPL
647866	2008 YU_{111}	—	November 7, 2008	Mount Lemmon	Mount Lemmon Survey	TEL	1.3 km	MPC · JPL
647867	2008 YL_{112}	—	December 31, 2008	Kitt Peak	Spacewatch	·	1.8 km	MPC · JPL
647868	2008 YT_{112}	—	December 31, 2008	Mount Lemmon	Mount Lemmon Survey	·	2.1 km	MPC · JPL
647869	2008 YG_{113}	—	December 21, 2008	Kitt Peak	Spacewatch	·	1.4 km	MPC · JPL
647870	2008 YE_{119}	—	December 29, 2008	Kitt Peak	Spacewatch	·	1.5 km	MPC · JPL
647871	2008 YC_{122}	—	December 30, 2008	Kitt Peak	Spacewatch	EOS	1.4 km	MPC · JPL
647872	2008 YK_{124}	—	December 30, 2008	Kitt Peak	Spacewatch	·	1.9 km	MPC · JPL
647873	2008 YU_{126}	—	December 22, 2008	Kitt Peak	Spacewatch	·	860 m	MPC · JPL
647874	2008 YA_{127}	—	December 30, 2008	Kitt Peak	Spacewatch	·	1.1 km	MPC · JPL
647875	2008 YT_{130}	—	December 31, 2008	Kitt Peak	Spacewatch	·	1.5 km	MPC · JPL
647876	2008 YC_{141}	—	December 22, 2003	Kitt Peak	Spacewatch	·	2.1 km	MPC · JPL
647877	2008 YS_{142}	—	December 30, 2008	Kitt Peak	Spacewatch	·	1.8 km	MPC · JPL
647878	2008 YL_{145}	—	December 30, 2008	Kitt Peak	Spacewatch	NYS	860 m	MPC · JPL
647879	2008 YB_{147}	—	December 31, 2008	Kitt Peak	Spacewatch	·	1.7 km	MPC · JPL
647880	2008 YB_{150}	—	December 21, 2008	Mount Lemmon	Mount Lemmon Survey	·	1.5 km	MPC · JPL
647881	2008 YX_{155}	—	December 22, 2008	Kitt Peak	Spacewatch	·	1.0 km	MPC · JPL
647882	2008 YF_{162}	—	December 21, 2008	Kitt Peak	Spacewatch	·	1.8 km	MPC · JPL
647883	2008 YK_{162}	—	December 18, 2003	Kitt Peak	Spacewatch	·	2.1 km	MPC · JPL
647884	2008 YC_{173}	—	December 30, 2008	Mount Lemmon	Mount Lemmon Survey	EOS	1.6 km	MPC · JPL
647885	2008 YW_{174}	—	October 30, 2007	Kitt Peak	Spacewatch	3:2	3.3 km	MPC · JPL
647886	2008 YZ_{174}	—	June 19, 2006	Mount Lemmon	Mount Lemmon Survey	·	2.2 km	MPC · JPL
647887	2008 YJ_{175}	—	December 21, 2008	Kitt Peak	Spacewatch	·	1.5 km	MPC · JPL
647888	2008 YB_{176}	—	December 21, 2008	Kitt Peak	Spacewatch	BRA	1.5 km	MPC · JPL
647889	2008 YV_{176}	—	December 31, 2008	Kitt Peak	Spacewatch	·	3.1 km	MPC · JPL
647890	2008 YX_{176}	—	December 21, 2008	Kitt Peak	Spacewatch	·	2.6 km	MPC · JPL
647891	2008 YM_{177}	—	December 22, 2008	Kitt Peak	Spacewatch	NYS	1.1 km	MPC · JPL
647892	2008 YR_{177}	—	December 31, 2008	Kitt Peak	Spacewatch	·	1.9 km	MPC · JPL
647893	2008 YZ_{177}	—	December 31, 2008	Kitt Peak	Spacewatch	EOS	1.6 km	MPC · JPL
647894	2008 YZ_{178}	—	October 31, 2013	Kitt Peak	Spacewatch	EOS	1.2 km	MPC · JPL
647895	2008 YG_{179}	—	August 16, 2017	Haleakala	Pan-STARRS 1	·	1.5 km	MPC · JPL
647896	2008 YL_{179}	—	February 16, 2015	Haleakala	Pan-STARRS 1	KOR	1.1 km	MPC · JPL
647897	2008 YQ_{179}	—	December 31, 2008	Mount Lemmon	Mount Lemmon Survey	NAE	2.3 km	MPC · JPL
647898	2008 YN_{180}	—	December 30, 2008	Kitt Peak	Spacewatch	·	1.5 km	MPC · JPL
647899	2008 YU_{181}	—	December 30, 2008	Mount Lemmon	Mount Lemmon Survey	·	1.1 km	MPC · JPL
647900	2008 YV_{181}	—	December 21, 2008	Kitt Peak	Spacewatch	·	1.0 km	MPC · JPL

== 647901–648000 ==
back to top

Designation			Discovery			Properties		Ref
Permanent	Provisional	Named after	Date	Site	Discoverer(s)	Category	Diam.	Ref
647901	2008 YH_{182}	—	January 27, 2015	Haleakala	Pan-STARRS 1	·	1.5 km	MPC · JPL
647902	2008 YL_{182}	—	December 22, 2008	Kitt Peak	Spacewatch	·	2.0 km	MPC · JPL
647903	2008 YM_{182}	—	January 10, 2013	Haleakala	Pan-STARRS 1	MAS	490 m	MPC · JPL
647904	2008 YZ_{182}	—	January 23, 2014	Kitt Peak	Spacewatch	·	1.8 km	MPC · JPL
647905	2008 YD_{183}	—	December 21, 2008	Mount Lemmon	Mount Lemmon Survey	·	1.8 km	MPC · JPL
647906	2008 YF_{183}	—	January 27, 2015	Haleakala	Pan-STARRS 1	EOS	1.5 km	MPC · JPL
647907	2008 YQ_{183}	—	December 21, 2008	Kitt Peak	Spacewatch	EOS	1.6 km	MPC · JPL
647908	2008 YT_{183}	—	December 28, 2013	Mount Lemmon	Mount Lemmon Survey	·	1.3 km	MPC · JPL
647909	2008 YA_{184}	—	December 31, 2008	Kitt Peak	Spacewatch	·	1.7 km	MPC · JPL
647910	2008 YF_{184}	—	December 29, 2008	Mount Lemmon	Mount Lemmon Survey	·	2.1 km	MPC · JPL
647911	2008 YL_{184}	—	November 27, 2013	Haleakala	Pan-STARRS 1	·	1.5 km	MPC · JPL
647912	2008 YM_{184}	—	November 24, 2008	Kitt Peak	Spacewatch	·	2.0 km	MPC · JPL
647913	2008 YO_{184}	—	December 22, 2008	Kitt Peak	Spacewatch	EOS	1.4 km	MPC · JPL
647914	2008 YT_{184}	—	July 26, 2017	Haleakala	Pan-STARRS 1	·	1.7 km	MPC · JPL
647915	2008 YG_{186}	—	July 4, 2017	Haleakala	Pan-STARRS 1	EOS	1.5 km	MPC · JPL
647916	2008 YO_{186}	—	November 28, 2013	Mount Lemmon	Mount Lemmon Survey	·	1.8 km	MPC · JPL
647917	2008 YE_{187}	—	December 31, 2008	Kitt Peak	Spacewatch	EOS	1.6 km	MPC · JPL
647918	2008 YG_{187}	—	December 29, 2008	Mount Lemmon	Mount Lemmon Survey	·	1.0 km	MPC · JPL
647919	2008 YT_{187}	—	December 30, 2008	Mount Lemmon	Mount Lemmon Survey	·	1.7 km	MPC · JPL
647920	2008 YK_{188}	—	December 30, 2008	Mount Lemmon	Mount Lemmon Survey	V	480 m	MPC · JPL
647921	2008 YM_{189}	—	December 31, 2008	Mount Lemmon	Mount Lemmon Survey	·	1.5 km	MPC · JPL
647922	2008 YN_{190}	—	December 29, 2008	Kitt Peak	Spacewatch	·	1.8 km	MPC · JPL
647923	2008 YK_{192}	—	December 30, 2008	Kitt Peak	Spacewatch	·	1.4 km	MPC · JPL
647924	2008 YQ_{192}	—	December 22, 2008	Mount Lemmon	Mount Lemmon Survey	EOS	1.5 km	MPC · JPL
647925	2008 YU_{192}	—	December 22, 2008	Kitt Peak	Spacewatch	EOS	1.6 km	MPC · JPL
647926	2008 YY_{192}	—	December 30, 2008	Mount Lemmon	Mount Lemmon Survey	·	1.7 km	MPC · JPL
647927	2008 YY_{193}	—	December 29, 2008	Kitt Peak	Spacewatch	·	1.8 km	MPC · JPL
647928	2008 YX_{194}	—	December 29, 2008	Mount Lemmon	Mount Lemmon Survey	·	1.7 km	MPC · JPL
647929	2008 YH_{195}	—	December 22, 2008	Kitt Peak	Spacewatch	EOS	1.4 km	MPC · JPL
647930	2008 YK_{196}	—	December 31, 2008	Kitt Peak	Spacewatch	·	1.8 km	MPC · JPL
647931	2008 YU_{197}	—	December 29, 2008	Mount Lemmon	Mount Lemmon Survey	EOS	1.4 km	MPC · JPL
647932	2009 AH_{3}	—	December 4, 2008	Kitt Peak	Spacewatch	·	3.1 km	MPC · JPL
647933	2009 AO_{4}	—	October 8, 2004	Kitt Peak	Spacewatch	NYS	1.1 km	MPC · JPL
647934	2009 AN_{5}	—	January 1, 2009	Kitt Peak	Spacewatch	·	870 m	MPC · JPL
647935	2009 AO_{6}	—	September 14, 2007	Mount Lemmon	Mount Lemmon Survey	3:2 · SHU	3.7 km	MPC · JPL
647936	2009 AS_{6}	—	January 1, 2009	Mount Lemmon	Mount Lemmon Survey	·	1.7 km	MPC · JPL
647937	2009 AP_{8}	—	December 22, 2008	Kitt Peak	Spacewatch	·	1.5 km	MPC · JPL
647938	2009 AV_{9}	—	December 22, 2008	Kitt Peak	Spacewatch	·	1.1 km	MPC · JPL
647939	2009 AU_{15}	—	December 22, 2008	Kitt Peak	Spacewatch	H	340 m	MPC · JPL
647940	2009 AK_{18}	—	November 17, 2004	Campo Imperatore	CINEOS	·	800 m	MPC · JPL
647941	2009 AQ_{23}	—	December 29, 2008	Kitt Peak	Spacewatch	·	1.1 km	MPC · JPL
647942	2009 AP_{24}	—	December 22, 2008	Kitt Peak	Spacewatch	MAS	500 m	MPC · JPL
647943	2009 AY_{26}	—	December 22, 2008	Kitt Peak	Spacewatch	·	1.1 km	MPC · JPL
647944	2009 AS_{29}	—	January 15, 2009	Kitt Peak	Spacewatch	KOR	960 m	MPC · JPL
647945	2009 AN_{37}	—	March 2, 2006	Kitt Peak	Wasserman, L. H., Millis, R. L.	MAS	760 m	MPC · JPL
647946	2009 AV_{42}	—	January 2, 2009	Mount Lemmon	Mount Lemmon Survey	NYS	1.0 km	MPC · JPL
647947	2009 AK_{47}	—	January 2, 2009	Kitt Peak	Spacewatch	NYS	880 m	MPC · JPL
647948	2009 AO_{47}	—	November 23, 2008	Mount Lemmon	Mount Lemmon Survey	·	1.9 km	MPC · JPL
647949	2009 AX_{47}	—	January 3, 2009	Kitt Peak	Spacewatch	MAS	540 m	MPC · JPL
647950	2009 AT_{50}	—	January 1, 2009	Kitt Peak	Spacewatch	·	1.6 km	MPC · JPL
647951	2009 AS_{51}	—	September 16, 1999	Kitt Peak	Spacewatch	3:2	3.7 km	MPC · JPL
647952	2009 AX_{53}	—	August 25, 2012	Mount Lemmon	Mount Lemmon Survey	·	1.4 km	MPC · JPL
647953	2009 AH_{59}	—	January 1, 2009	Mount Lemmon	Mount Lemmon Survey	·	1.6 km	MPC · JPL
647954	2009 AO_{59}	—	January 1, 2009	Mount Lemmon	Mount Lemmon Survey	·	820 m	MPC · JPL
647955	2009 AT_{60}	—	January 1, 2009	Mount Lemmon	Mount Lemmon Survey	·	980 m	MPC · JPL
647956	2009 AW_{63}	—	January 2, 2009	Mount Lemmon	Mount Lemmon Survey	·	1.4 km	MPC · JPL
647957	2009 BJ_{5}	—	January 2, 2009	Kitt Peak	Spacewatch	·	860 m	MPC · JPL
647958	2009 BF_{13}	—	January 21, 2009	Bergisch Gladbach	W. Bickel	H	440 m	MPC · JPL
647959	2009 BX_{14}	—	December 31, 2008	Kitt Peak	Spacewatch	·	1.9 km	MPC · JPL
647960	2009 BE_{18}	—	January 16, 2009	Kitt Peak	Spacewatch	·	1.0 km	MPC · JPL
647961	2009 BF_{19}	—	April 26, 2006	Mount Lemmon	Mount Lemmon Survey	NYS	1.3 km	MPC · JPL
647962	2009 BB_{20}	—	December 21, 2008	Mount Lemmon	Mount Lemmon Survey	KOR	1.2 km	MPC · JPL
647963	2009 BM_{29}	—	January 16, 2009	Kitt Peak	Spacewatch	·	2.1 km	MPC · JPL
647964	2009 BV_{36}	—	January 16, 2009	Mount Lemmon	Mount Lemmon Survey	·	2.0 km	MPC · JPL
647965	2009 BN_{41}	—	January 16, 2009	Kitt Peak	Spacewatch	·	960 m	MPC · JPL
647966	2009 BX_{48}	—	April 21, 2006	Kitt Peak	Spacewatch	NYS	1.3 km	MPC · JPL
647967	2009 BC_{57}	—	January 18, 2009	Mount Lemmon	Mount Lemmon Survey	·	1.9 km	MPC · JPL
647968	2009 BN_{59}	—	October 31, 2008	Mount Lemmon	Mount Lemmon Survey	·	1.1 km	MPC · JPL
647969	2009 BG_{61}	—	January 18, 2009	Kitt Peak	Spacewatch	H	340 m	MPC · JPL
647970	2009 BC_{86}	—	September 14, 2007	Mount Lemmon	Mount Lemmon Survey	·	1.2 km	MPC · JPL
647971	2009 BG_{97}	—	June 9, 2006	Palomar	NEAT	·	1.4 km	MPC · JPL
647972	2009 BX_{102}	—	January 30, 2009	Mount Lemmon	Mount Lemmon Survey	·	1.2 km	MPC · JPL
647973	2009 BO_{107}	—	January 29, 2009	Kitt Peak	Spacewatch	·	1.2 km	MPC · JPL
647974	2009 BZ_{108}	—	January 30, 2009	Bergisch Gladbach	W. Bickel	NYS	1.3 km	MPC · JPL
647975	2009 BJ_{109}	—	January 30, 2009	Mount Lemmon	Mount Lemmon Survey	EOS	1.9 km	MPC · JPL
647976	2009 BK_{134}	—	January 29, 2009	Kitt Peak	Spacewatch	KOR	1.3 km	MPC · JPL
647977	2009 BO_{134}	—	January 29, 2009	Kitt Peak	Spacewatch	·	1.5 km	MPC · JPL
647978	2009 BN_{135}	—	December 22, 2008	Kitt Peak	Spacewatch	·	1.3 km	MPC · JPL
647979	2009 BF_{138}	—	October 19, 2007	Mount Lemmon	Mount Lemmon Survey	·	1.3 km	MPC · JPL
647980	2009 BY_{138}	—	January 29, 2009	Kitt Peak	Spacewatch	·	650 m	MPC · JPL
647981	2009 BH_{142}	—	January 30, 2009	Kitt Peak	Spacewatch	EOS	1.5 km	MPC · JPL
647982	2009 BR_{148}	—	December 22, 2008	Kitt Peak	Spacewatch	·	1.7 km	MPC · JPL
647983	2009 BD_{153}	—	December 22, 2008	Kitt Peak	Spacewatch	·	900 m	MPC · JPL
647984	2009 BR_{161}	—	January 24, 2009	Cerro Burek	Burek, Cerro	·	2.3 km	MPC · JPL
647985	2009 BX_{168}	—	February 1, 2009	Mount Lemmon	Mount Lemmon Survey	·	2.1 km	MPC · JPL
647986	2009 BK_{180}	—	March 21, 1999	Apache Point	SDSS	EOS	1.3 km	MPC · JPL
647987	2009 BR_{188}	—	January 20, 2009	Mount Lemmon	Mount Lemmon Survey	TIR	2.5 km	MPC · JPL
647988	2009 BM_{189}	—	February 2, 2009	Mount Lemmon	Mount Lemmon Survey	·	1.3 km	MPC · JPL
647989	2009 BE_{193}	—	January 20, 2009	Mount Lemmon	Mount Lemmon Survey	·	1.5 km	MPC · JPL
647990	2009 BM_{196}	—	December 28, 2013	Kitt Peak	Spacewatch	·	2.3 km	MPC · JPL
647991	2009 BO_{197}	—	March 20, 1999	Apache Point	SDSS Collaboration	·	2.2 km	MPC · JPL
647992	2009 BT_{199}	—	January 20, 2009	Kitt Peak	Spacewatch	·	970 m	MPC · JPL
647993	2009 BY_{205}	—	January 29, 2009	Kitt Peak	Spacewatch	·	1.6 km	MPC · JPL
647994	2009 BA_{206}	—	January 31, 2009	Mount Lemmon	Mount Lemmon Survey	EOS	1.4 km	MPC · JPL
647995	2009 BG_{206}	—	January 25, 2009	Kitt Peak	Spacewatch	·	2.2 km	MPC · JPL
647996	2009 BY_{206}	—	January 29, 2009	Mount Lemmon	Mount Lemmon Survey	·	1.5 km	MPC · JPL
647997	2009 BT_{212}	—	January 20, 2009	Kitt Peak	Spacewatch	·	1.3 km	MPC · JPL
647998	2009 BV_{214}	—	January 16, 2009	Kitt Peak	Spacewatch	·	1.3 km	MPC · JPL
647999	2009 BU_{216}	—	January 20, 2009	Mount Lemmon	Mount Lemmon Survey	·	1.9 km	MPC · JPL
648000	2009 CD_{4}	—	December 31, 2008	Catalina	CSS	·	1.7 km	MPC · JPL

back to top

== Meaning of names ==
As minor planet discoveries are confirmed, they are given a permanent number by the IAU's Minor Planet Center (MPC), and the discoverers can then submit names for them, following the IAU's naming conventions. The list below concerns those minor planets in the specified number-range that have received names, and explains the meanings of those names.

Official naming citations of newly named small Solar System bodies are approved and published in a bulletin by IAU's Working Group for Small Bodies Nomenclature (WGSBN). Before May 2021, citations were published in MPC's Minor Planet Circulars for many decades. Recent citations can also be found on the JPL Small-Body Database (SBDB). Until his death in 2016, German astronomer Lutz D. Schmadel compiled these citations into the Dictionary of Minor Planet Names (DMP) and regularly updated the collection.

Based on Paul Herget's The Names of the Minor Planets, Schmadel also researched the unclear origin of numerous asteroids, most of which had been named prior to World War II. This article incorporates text from this source, which is in the public domain: SBDB New namings may only be added to this list below after official publication as the preannouncement of names is condemned. The WGSBN publishes a comprehensive guideline for the naming rules of non-cometary small Solar System bodies.

Named minor planet	Provisional	This minor planet was named for...	Ref · Catalog
647779 Ansari	2008 XF_{7}	Anousheh Ansari (b. 1966), Iranian-American engineer.	IAU · 647779
