= List of minor planets: 876001–877000 =

The following is a partial list of minor planets, running from minor-planet number 876001 through 877000, inclusive. The primary data for this and other partial lists is based on JPL's "Small-Body Orbital Elements" and data available from the Minor Planet Center. Critical list information is also provided by the MPC, unless otherwise specified from Lowell Observatory. A detailed description of the table's columns and additional sources are given on the main page including a complete list of every page in this series, and a statistical break-up on the dynamical classification of minor planets.

Also see the summary list of all named bodies in numerical and alphabetical order, and the corresponding naming citations for the number range of this particular list. New namings may only be added to this list after official publication, as the preannouncement of names is condemned by the Working Group for Small Bodies Nomenclature of the International Astronomical Union.

Near-Earth obj.	MBA (inner)	MBA (outer)	Centaur
Mars-crosser	MBA (middle)	Jupiter trojan	Trans-Neptunian obj.
Unclassified

== 876001–876100 ==
Designation			Discovery			Properties		Ref
Permanent	Provisional	Named after	Date	Site	Discoverer(s)	Category	Diam.	Ref
876001	2006 UR_{349}	—	October 26, 2006	Mauna Kea	P. A. Wiegert	KOR	750 m	MPC · JPL
876002	2006 UD_{350}	—	October 26, 2006	Mauna Kea	P. A. Wiegert	KOR	830 m	MPC · JPL
876003	2006 UD_{359}	—	October 20, 2006	Kitt Peak	Spacewatch	·	1.3 km	MPC · JPL
876004	2006 UK_{364}	—	October 21, 2006	Mount Lemmon	Mount Lemmon Survey	·	630 m	MPC · JPL
876005	2006 UB_{372}	—	October 2, 2006	Kitt Peak	Spacewatch	·	1.2 km	MPC · JPL
876006	2006 UA_{377}	—	October 27, 2006	Catalina	CSS	TIR	2.1 km	MPC · JPL
876007	2006 UM_{386}	—	October 21, 2006	Kitt Peak	Spacewatch	KOR	1.0 km	MPC · JPL
876008	2006 UZ_{395}	—	October 17, 2006	Catalina	CSS	·	1.2 km	MPC · JPL
876009	2006 VW_{18}	—	October 21, 2006	Kitt Peak	Spacewatch	·	1.3 km	MPC · JPL
876010	2006 VN_{22}	—	September 27, 2006	Mount Lemmon	Mount Lemmon Survey	·	1.0 km	MPC · JPL
876011	2006 VH_{76}	—	November 12, 2006	Mount Lemmon	Mount Lemmon Survey	·	1.2 km	MPC · JPL
876012	2006 VD_{79}	—	November 12, 2006	Mount Lemmon	Mount Lemmon Survey	·	2.1 km	MPC · JPL
876013	2006 VV_{83}	—	November 13, 2006	Kitt Peak	Spacewatch	·	680 m	MPC · JPL
876014	2006 VY_{86}	—	November 1, 2006	Mount Lemmon	Mount Lemmon Survey	·	950 m	MPC · JPL
876015	2006 VP_{88}	—	November 14, 2006	Mount Lemmon	Mount Lemmon Survey	·	1.2 km	MPC · JPL
876016	2006 VJ_{93}	—	October 31, 2006	Mount Lemmon	Mount Lemmon Survey	H	300 m	MPC · JPL
876017	2006 VH_{110}	—	October 4, 2006	Mount Lemmon	Mount Lemmon Survey	·	540 m	MPC · JPL
876018	2006 VL_{173}	—	November 11, 2006	Kitt Peak	Spacewatch	·	1.5 km	MPC · JPL
876019	2006 VS_{183}	—	November 1, 2006	Mount Lemmon	Mount Lemmon Survey	KOR	860 m	MPC · JPL
876020	2006 WX_{18}	—	October 3, 2006	Mount Lemmon	Mount Lemmon Survey	PHO	740 m	MPC · JPL
876021	2006 WT_{29}	—	November 22, 2006	Mount Lemmon	Mount Lemmon Survey	AMO	390 m	MPC · JPL
876022	2006 WY_{34}	—	October 22, 2006	Mount Lemmon	Mount Lemmon Survey	(194)	1.1 km	MPC · JPL
876023	2006 WB_{39}	—	November 16, 2006	Kitt Peak	Spacewatch	·	1.4 km	MPC · JPL
876024	2006 WP_{47}	—	November 16, 2006	Kitt Peak	Spacewatch	URS	2.1 km	MPC · JPL
876025	2006 WL_{58}	—	November 17, 2006	Kitt Peak	Spacewatch	·	1.6 km	MPC · JPL
876026	2006 WS_{87}	—	November 18, 2006	Mount Lemmon	Mount Lemmon Survey	·	1.4 km	MPC · JPL
876027	2006 WD_{92}	—	November 11, 2006	Mount Lemmon	Mount Lemmon Survey	CLO · critical	1.1 km	MPC · JPL
876028	2006 WS_{92}	—	October 31, 2006	Mount Lemmon	Mount Lemmon Survey	·	760 m	MPC · JPL
876029	2006 WO_{105}	—	October 31, 2006	Mount Lemmon	Mount Lemmon Survey	·	770 m	MPC · JPL
876030	2006 WN_{167}	—	November 23, 2006	Kitt Peak	Spacewatch	·	1.3 km	MPC · JPL
876031	2006 WL_{224}	—	November 17, 2006	Kitt Peak	Spacewatch	·	810 m	MPC · JPL
876032	2006 WP_{227}	—	November 27, 2006	Mount Lemmon	Mount Lemmon Survey	GEF	820 m	MPC · JPL
876033	2006 WO_{228}	—	December 31, 2013	Mount Lemmon	Mount Lemmon Survey	·	2.9 km	MPC · JPL
876034	2006 XF_{1}	—	December 10, 2006	Socorro	LINEAR	APO	420 m	MPC · JPL
876035	2006 XR_{14}	—	November 18, 2006	Kitt Peak	Spacewatch	H	430 m	MPC · JPL
876036	2006 XZ_{31}	—	November 16, 2006	Mount Lemmon	Mount Lemmon Survey	EUN	860 m	MPC · JPL
876037	2006 XN_{52}	—	December 11, 2006	Kitt Peak	Spacewatch	·	720 m	MPC · JPL
876038	2006 XW_{76}	—	January 27, 2011	Mount Lemmon	Mount Lemmon Survey	·	690 m	MPC · JPL
876039	2006 XG_{83}	—	December 15, 2006	Mount Lemmon	Mount Lemmon Survey	·	660 m	MPC · JPL
876040	2006 YK_{18}	—	November 16, 2006	Mount Lemmon	Mount Lemmon Survey	critical	920 m	MPC · JPL
876041	2006 YH_{25}	—	December 21, 2006	Kitt Peak	Spacewatch	PHO	690 m	MPC · JPL
876042	2006 YS_{60}	—	December 21, 2006	Kitt Peak	L. H. Wasserman, M. W. Buie	·	590 m	MPC · JPL
876043	2006 YU_{63}	—	April 1, 2014	Kitt Peak	Spacewatch	·	1.4 km	MPC · JPL
876044	2007 BY	—	January 10, 2007	Mount Lemmon	Mount Lemmon Survey	·	540 m	MPC · JPL
876045	2007 BD_{92}	—	January 19, 2007	Mauna Kea	P. A. Wiegert	·	700 m	MPC · JPL
876046	2007 BK_{121}	—	January 17, 2007	Kitt Peak	Spacewatch	·	1.1 km	MPC · JPL
876047	2007 CB_{69}	—	February 14, 2007	Mauna Kea	P. A. Wiegert	·	1.2 km	MPC · JPL
876048	2007 CX_{74}	—	February 14, 2007	Mauna Kea	P. A. Wiegert	·	980 m	MPC · JPL
876049	2007 DZ_{40}	—	February 22, 2007	Catalina	CSS	T_{j} (2.87) · APO	660 m	MPC · JPL
876050	2007 DL_{73}	—	February 21, 2007	Kitt Peak	Spacewatch	·	860 m	MPC · JPL
876051	2007 DB_{96}	—	February 23, 2007	Kitt Peak	Spacewatch	H	320 m	MPC · JPL
876052	2007 DT_{124}	—	June 11, 2013	Kitt Peak	Spacewatch	·	1.6 km	MPC · JPL
876053	2007 DL_{130}	—	February 23, 2007	Mount Lemmon	Mount Lemmon Survey	·	1.2 km	MPC · JPL
876054	2007 EN_{90}	—	February 21, 2007	Kitt Peak	Spacewatch	·	860 m	MPC · JPL
876055	2007 EZ_{164}	—	March 15, 2007	Kitt Peak	Spacewatch	·	1.1 km	MPC · JPL
876056	2007 EV_{232}	—	April 14, 2018	Mount Lemmon	Mount Lemmon Survey	·	1.7 km	MPC · JPL
876057	2007 EZ_{244}	—	March 12, 2007	Kitt Peak	Spacewatch	·	1.6 km	MPC · JPL
876058	2007 FO	—	March 16, 2007	Mount Lemmon	Mount Lemmon Survey	·	1.8 km	MPC · JPL
876059	2007 GX_{37}	—	April 14, 2007	Kitt Peak	Spacewatch	·	1 km	MPC · JPL
876060	2007 GQ_{68}	—	April 14, 2007	Mount Lemmon	Mount Lemmon Survey	·	720 m	MPC · JPL
876061	2007 GX_{78}	—	April 14, 2007	Kitt Peak	Spacewatch	·	590 m	MPC · JPL
876062	2007 GL_{79}	—	April 16, 2018	Haleakala	Pan-STARRS 1	·	2.0 km	MPC · JPL
876063	2007 GL_{80}	—	April 7, 2007	Mount Lemmon	Mount Lemmon Survey	THM	1.4 km	MPC · JPL
876064	2007 HF_{5}	—	March 13, 2007	Catalina	CSS	·	2.7 km	MPC · JPL
876065	2007 HG_{18}	—	April 16, 2007	Mount Lemmon	Mount Lemmon Survey	PHO	610 m	MPC · JPL
876066	2007 HC_{36}	—	April 19, 2007	Kitt Peak	Spacewatch	critical	1.7 km	MPC · JPL
876067	2007 HN_{47}	—	March 14, 2007	Mount Lemmon	Mount Lemmon Survey	·	1.5 km	MPC · JPL
876068	2007 HE_{104}	—	March 29, 2012	Haleakala	Pan-STARRS 1	·	1.3 km	MPC · JPL
876069	2007 HK_{105}	—	April 25, 2007	Mount Lemmon	Mount Lemmon Survey	·	1.8 km	MPC · JPL
876070	2007 HE_{108}	—	December 4, 2015	Haleakala	Pan-STARRS 1	·	1.3 km	MPC · JPL
876071	2007 HY_{109}	—	April 25, 2015	Haleakala	Pan-STARRS 1	T_{j} (2.99) · 3:2	3.8 km	MPC · JPL
876072	2007 JG_{2}	—	May 7, 2007	Mount Lemmon	Mount Lemmon Survey	·	1.2 km	MPC · JPL
876073	2007 JH_{52}	—	May 15, 2007	Mount Lemmon	Mount Lemmon Survey	·	2.0 km	MPC · JPL
876074	2007 LK_{2}	—	June 7, 2007	Kitt Peak	Spacewatch	·	1.1 km	MPC · JPL
876075	2007 LG_{6}	—	May 7, 2007	Mount Lemmon	Mount Lemmon Survey	·	1.8 km	MPC · JPL
876076	2007 LE_{25}	—	June 14, 2007	Kitt Peak	Spacewatch	JUN	840 m	MPC · JPL
876077	2007 LF_{25}	—	June 14, 2007	Kitt Peak	Spacewatch	·	2.0 km	MPC · JPL
876078	2007 ML_{3}	—	June 16, 2007	Kitt Peak	Spacewatch	THB	2.1 km	MPC · JPL
876079	2007 MY_{26}	—	February 2, 2006	Mount Lemmon	Mount Lemmon Survey	·	1.2 km	MPC · JPL
876080	2007 NV_{3}	—	June 22, 2007	Siding Spring	SSS	·	2.5 km	MPC · JPL
876081	2007 PM_{7}	—	September 22, 2003	Palomar	NEAT	·	1.3 km	MPC · JPL
876082	2007 PF_{19}	—	August 9, 2007	Socorro	LINEAR	·	570 m	MPC · JPL
876083	2007 PK_{30}	—	August 11, 2007	Socorro	LINEAR	·	1.1 km	MPC · JPL
876084	2007 PB_{54}	—	August 10, 2007	Kitt Peak	Spacewatch	·	1.1 km	MPC · JPL
876085	2007 PX_{54}	—	August 10, 2007	Kitt Peak	Spacewatch	·	2.1 km	MPC · JPL
876086	2007 QE_{13}	—	August 16, 2007	XuYi	PMO NEO Survey Program	·	670 m	MPC · JPL
876087	2007 QU_{14}	—	August 24, 2007	Kitt Peak	Spacewatch	·	1.1 km	MPC · JPL
876088	2007 RJ_{2}	—	September 2, 2007	Mount Lemmon	Mount Lemmon Survey	·	2.6 km	MPC · JPL
876089	2007 RX_{9}	—	August 16, 2007	XuYi	PMO NEO Survey Program	·	1.1 km	MPC · JPL
876090	2007 RT_{18}	—	August 23, 2007	Kitt Peak	Spacewatch	·	550 m	MPC · JPL
876091	2007 RV_{19}	—	June 26, 2007	Catalina	CSS	T_{j} (2.78) · AMO	620 m	MPC · JPL
876092	2007 RQ_{25}	—	September 4, 2007	Mount Lemmon	Mount Lemmon Survey	·	2.0 km	MPC · JPL
876093	2007 RF_{51}	—	September 9, 2007	Kitt Peak	Spacewatch	·	640 m	MPC · JPL
876094	2007 RM_{56}	—	September 9, 2007	Mount Lemmon	Mount Lemmon Survey	·	1.1 km	MPC · JPL
876095	2007 RP_{69}	—	September 10, 2007	Kitt Peak	Spacewatch	·	1.2 km	MPC · JPL
876096	2007 RH_{70}	—	September 10, 2007	Kitt Peak	Spacewatch	·	1.3 km	MPC · JPL
876097	2007 RV_{71}	—	August 10, 2007	Kitt Peak	Spacewatch	·	870 m	MPC · JPL
876098	2007 RY_{88}	—	September 10, 2007	Mount Lemmon	Mount Lemmon Survey	EUP	2.5 km	MPC · JPL
876099	2007 RS_{96}	—	September 10, 2007	Mount Lemmon	Mount Lemmon Survey	·	1.2 km	MPC · JPL
876100	2007 RK_{97}	—	September 10, 2007	Kitt Peak	Spacewatch	ADE	1.3 km	MPC · JPL

== 876101–876200 ==
back to top

Designation			Discovery			Properties		Ref
Permanent	Provisional	Named after	Date	Site	Discoverer(s)	Category	Diam.	Ref
876101	2007 RV_{106}	—	September 11, 2007	Mount Lemmon	Mount Lemmon Survey	·	1.1 km	MPC · JPL
876102	2007 RR_{108}	—	September 11, 2007	Kitt Peak	Spacewatch	·	510 m	MPC · JPL
876103	2007 RG_{110}	—	September 11, 2007	Mount Lemmon	Mount Lemmon Survey	·	1 km	MPC · JPL
876104	2007 RL_{111}	—	September 11, 2007	Kitt Peak	Spacewatch	·	1.0 km	MPC · JPL
876105	2007 RT_{117}	—	September 11, 2007	Kitt Peak	Spacewatch	LIX	2.3 km	MPC · JPL
876106	2007 RQ_{128}	—	September 12, 2007	Mount Lemmon	Mount Lemmon Survey	·	940 m	MPC · JPL
876107	2007 RT_{142}	—	August 22, 2007	Socorro	LINEAR	·	1.0 km	MPC · JPL
876108	2007 RH_{156}	—	September 10, 2007	Mount Lemmon	Mount Lemmon Survey	critical	1.3 km	MPC · JPL
876109	2007 RS_{162}	—	September 10, 2007	Kitt Peak	Spacewatch	critical	410 m	MPC · JPL
876110	2007 RC_{163}	—	September 10, 2007	Kitt Peak	Spacewatch	·	2.0 km	MPC · JPL
876111	2007 RB_{167}	—	August 24, 2007	Kitt Peak	Spacewatch	LEO	1.1 km	MPC · JPL
876112	2007 RB_{174}	—	September 10, 2007	Kitt Peak	Spacewatch	·	1.8 km	MPC · JPL
876113	2007 RC_{177}	—	September 10, 2007	Mount Lemmon	Mount Lemmon Survey	·	580 m	MPC · JPL
876114	2007 RV_{182}	—	September 12, 2007	Mount Lemmon	Mount Lemmon Survey	·	1.2 km	MPC · JPL
876115	2007 RW_{183}	—	September 13, 2007	Mount Lemmon	Mount Lemmon Survey	·	870 m	MPC · JPL
876116	2007 RU_{184}	—	September 13, 2007	Catalina	CSS	·	1.2 km	MPC · JPL
876117	2007 RT_{188}	—	September 10, 2007	Kitt Peak	Spacewatch	·	960 m	MPC · JPL
876118	2007 RF_{195}	—	September 12, 2007	Kitt Peak	Spacewatch	·	2.0 km	MPC · JPL
876119	2007 RE_{198}	—	September 13, 2007	Mount Lemmon	Mount Lemmon Survey	·	2.0 km	MPC · JPL
876120	2007 RW_{213}	—	September 12, 2007	Kitt Peak	Spacewatch	·	1.8 km	MPC · JPL
876121	2007 RN_{215}	—	September 12, 2007	Kitt Peak	Spacewatch	·	1.2 km	MPC · JPL
876122	2007 RT_{235}	—	September 12, 2007	Mount Lemmon	Mount Lemmon Survey	·	2.1 km	MPC · JPL
876123	2007 RJ_{250}	—	September 13, 2007	Kitt Peak	Spacewatch	·	1.1 km	MPC · JPL
876124	2007 RD_{266}	—	September 15, 2007	Mount Lemmon	Mount Lemmon Survey	EUN	880 m	MPC · JPL
876125	2007 RK_{271}	—	September 15, 2007	Mount Lemmon	Mount Lemmon Survey	·	600 m	MPC · JPL
876126	2007 RE_{273}	—	September 15, 2007	Kitt Peak	Spacewatch	THB	2.0 km	MPC · JPL
876127	2007 RA_{280}	—	September 10, 2007	Catalina	CSS	·	1.2 km	MPC · JPL
876128	2007 RW_{282}	—	September 12, 2007	Mount Lemmon	Mount Lemmon Survey	·	880 m	MPC · JPL
876129	2007 RB_{292}	—	September 12, 2007	Mount Lemmon	Mount Lemmon Survey	·	940 m	MPC · JPL
876130	2007 RQ_{303}	—	September 14, 2007	Mauna Kea	P. A. Wiegert	·	1.1 km	MPC · JPL
876131	2007 RY_{321}	—	September 9, 2007	Kitt Peak	Spacewatch	·	1.1 km	MPC · JPL
876132	2007 RP_{325}	—	September 8, 2007	Mount Lemmon	Mount Lemmon Survey	·	1.1 km	MPC · JPL
876133	2007 RB_{328}	—	September 15, 2007	Mount Lemmon	Mount Lemmon Survey	·	1.7 km	MPC · JPL
876134	2007 RT_{330}	—	September 12, 2007	Mount Lemmon	Mount Lemmon Survey	·	970 m	MPC · JPL
876135	2007 RH_{331}	—	September 12, 2007	Mount Lemmon	Mount Lemmon Survey	·	870 m	MPC · JPL
876136	2007 RQ_{331}	—	September 13, 2007	Mount Lemmon	Mount Lemmon Survey	·	1.1 km	MPC · JPL
876137	2007 RX_{336}	—	September 13, 2007	Kitt Peak	Spacewatch	·	1.0 km	MPC · JPL
876138	2007 RA_{338}	—	September 12, 2007	Mount Lemmon	Mount Lemmon Survey	·	1.1 km	MPC · JPL
876139	2007 RX_{343}	—	September 1, 2013	Mount Lemmon	Mount Lemmon Survey	THM	1.8 km	MPC · JPL
876140	2007 RA_{345}	—	October 14, 2012	Catalina	CSS	·	1.7 km	MPC · JPL
876141	2007 RN_{347}	—	August 15, 2013	Haleakala	Pan-STARRS 1	·	630 m	MPC · JPL
876142	2007 RM_{348}	—	March 21, 2017	Haleakala	Pan-STARRS 1	TIR	1.9 km	MPC · JPL
876143	2007 RB_{351}	—	September 14, 2007	Mount Lemmon	Mount Lemmon Survey	·	2.1 km	MPC · JPL
876144	2007 RF_{353}	—	September 12, 2007	Mount Lemmon	Mount Lemmon Survey	·	2.3 km	MPC · JPL
876145	2007 RU_{353}	—	September 14, 2007	Mount Lemmon	Mount Lemmon Survey	·	1.0 km	MPC · JPL
876146	2007 RK_{358}	—	September 13, 2007	Catalina	CSS	·	760 m	MPC · JPL
876147	2007 RR_{358}	—	September 5, 2007	Mount Lemmon	Mount Lemmon Survey	·	990 m	MPC · JPL
876148	2007 RW_{358}	—	September 13, 2007	Mount Lemmon	Mount Lemmon Survey	·	970 m	MPC · JPL
876149	2007 RH_{359}	—	September 10, 2007	Mount Lemmon	Mount Lemmon Survey	·	960 m	MPC · JPL
876150	2007 RA_{360}	—	September 11, 2007	Kitt Peak	Spacewatch	·	2.0 km	MPC · JPL
876151	2007 RP_{360}	—	September 11, 2007	Mount Lemmon	Mount Lemmon Survey	·	1.1 km	MPC · JPL
876152	2007 RN_{361}	—	September 11, 2007	Mount Lemmon	Mount Lemmon Survey	·	1.0 km	MPC · JPL
876153	2007 RZ_{361}	—	September 11, 2007	Mount Lemmon	Mount Lemmon Survey	·	950 m	MPC · JPL
876154	2007 RK_{362}	—	September 14, 2007	Mount Lemmon	Mount Lemmon Survey	·	1.1 km	MPC · JPL
876155	2007 RU_{364}	—	September 14, 2007	Mount Lemmon	Mount Lemmon Survey	·	860 m	MPC · JPL
876156	2007 RC_{367}	—	September 14, 2007	Mount Lemmon	Mount Lemmon Survey	·	1.0 km	MPC · JPL
876157	2007 RT_{367}	—	September 10, 2007	Mount Lemmon	Mount Lemmon Survey	ADE	1.4 km	MPC · JPL
876158	2007 RU_{367}	—	September 11, 2007	Mount Lemmon	Mount Lemmon Survey	·	2.4 km	MPC · JPL
876159	2007 RP_{379}	—	September 13, 2007	Mount Lemmon	Mount Lemmon Survey	·	1.2 km	MPC · JPL
876160	2007 RF_{380}	—	September 13, 2007	Mount Lemmon	Mount Lemmon Survey	·	1.3 km	MPC · JPL
876161	2007 RD_{381}	—	June 15, 2018	Haleakala	Pan-STARRS 1	·	2.1 km	MPC · JPL
876162	2007 RK_{383}	—	September 8, 2007	Mount Lemmon	Mount Lemmon Survey	·	1.4 km	MPC · JPL
876163	2007 RS_{383}	—	September 13, 2007	Mount Lemmon	Mount Lemmon Survey	·	1.9 km	MPC · JPL
876164	2007 RE_{385}	—	September 13, 2007	Mount Lemmon	Mount Lemmon Survey	·	1.9 km	MPC · JPL
876165	2007 SJ_{3}	—	September 13, 2007	Catalina	CSS	·	920 m	MPC · JPL
876166	2007 SM_{8}	—	September 10, 2007	Kitt Peak	Spacewatch	MAS	490 m	MPC · JPL
876167	2007 SV_{13}	—	September 19, 2007	Kitt Peak	Spacewatch	·	700 m	MPC · JPL
876168	2007 SK_{27}	—	September 19, 2007	Kitt Peak	Spacewatch	·	1 km	MPC · JPL
876169	2007 SQ_{28}	—	September 19, 2007	Kitt Peak	Spacewatch	·	990 m	MPC · JPL
876170	2007 TA_{2}	—	September 11, 2007	Mount Lemmon	Mount Lemmon Survey	·	2.2 km	MPC · JPL
876171	2007 TP_{8}	—	October 7, 2007	Mount Lemmon	Mount Lemmon Survey	·	2.3 km	MPC · JPL
876172	2007 TS_{8}	—	October 7, 2007	Mount Lemmon	Mount Lemmon Survey	·	490 m	MPC · JPL
876173	2007 TK_{19}	—	October 6, 2007	Kitt Peak	Spacewatch	·	280 m	MPC · JPL
876174	2007 TR_{24}	—	October 11, 2007	Catalina	CSS	APO · PHA	280 m	MPC · JPL
876175	2007 TX_{33}	—	October 6, 2007	Kitt Peak	Spacewatch	·	640 m	MPC · JPL
876176	2007 TC_{37}	—	October 4, 2007	Kitt Peak	Spacewatch	·	2.0 km	MPC · JPL
876177	2007 TZ_{43}	—	October 7, 2007	Kitt Peak	Spacewatch	·	1.8 km	MPC · JPL
876178	2007 TX_{45}	—	October 4, 2007	Kitt Peak	Spacewatch	·	660 m	MPC · JPL
876179	2007 TS_{53}	—	September 15, 2007	Mount Lemmon	Mount Lemmon Survey	·	690 m	MPC · JPL
876180	2007 TU_{56}	—	October 4, 2007	Kitt Peak	Spacewatch	NYS	670 m	MPC · JPL
876181	2007 TE_{62}	—	October 7, 2007	Mount Lemmon	Mount Lemmon Survey	·	1.2 km	MPC · JPL
876182	2007 TG_{83}	—	September 13, 2007	Mount Lemmon	Mount Lemmon Survey	JUN	660 m	MPC · JPL
876183	2007 TW_{93}	—	October 6, 2007	Kitt Peak	Spacewatch	·	1.1 km	MPC · JPL
876184	2007 TK_{100}	—	October 8, 2007	Mount Lemmon	Mount Lemmon Survey	NAE	1.5 km	MPC · JPL
876185	2007 TO_{101}	—	October 8, 2007	Mount Lemmon	Mount Lemmon Survey	·	950 m	MPC · JPL
876186	2007 TV_{104}	—	October 8, 2007	Mount Lemmon	Mount Lemmon Survey	JUN	840 m	MPC · JPL
876187	2007 TQ_{112}	—	September 13, 2007	Kitt Peak	Spacewatch	·	2.2 km	MPC · JPL
876188	2007 TA_{133}	—	October 7, 2007	Mount Lemmon	Mount Lemmon Survey	NYS	700 m	MPC · JPL
876189	2007 TH_{136}	—	October 8, 2007	Catalina	CSS	·	940 m	MPC · JPL
876190	2007 TA_{142}	—	October 9, 2007	Mount Lemmon	Mount Lemmon Survey	·	2.0 km	MPC · JPL
876191	2007 TO_{154}	—	October 9, 2007	Socorro	LINEAR	·	530 m	MPC · JPL
876192	2007 TX_{158}	—	October 7, 2007	Catalina	CSS	·	1.5 km	MPC · JPL
876193	2007 TN_{172}	—	October 8, 2007	Mount Lemmon	Mount Lemmon Survey	THM	1.7 km	MPC · JPL
876194	2007 TP_{175}	—	October 4, 2007	Kitt Peak	Spacewatch	LIX	2.8 km	MPC · JPL
876195	2007 TS_{177}	—	October 6, 2007	Kitt Peak	Spacewatch	T_{j} (2.98) · 3:2 · (6124)	3.3 km	MPC · JPL
876196	2007 TO_{181}	—	October 8, 2007	Anderson Mesa	LONEOS	JUN	980 m	MPC · JPL
876197	2007 TC_{196}	—	September 13, 2007	Mount Lemmon	Mount Lemmon Survey	NYS	680 m	MPC · JPL
876198	2007 TM_{198}	—	October 8, 2007	Kitt Peak	Spacewatch	NYS	620 m	MPC · JPL
876199	2007 TG_{205}	—	October 8, 2007	Mount Lemmon	Mount Lemmon Survey	·	890 m	MPC · JPL
876200	2007 TT_{226}	—	October 8, 2007	Kitt Peak	Spacewatch	·	2.1 km	MPC · JPL

== 876201–876300 ==
back to top

Designation			Discovery			Properties		Ref
Permanent	Provisional	Named after	Date	Site	Discoverer(s)	Category	Diam.	Ref
876201	2007 TY_{240}	—	September 11, 2007	Mount Lemmon	Mount Lemmon Survey	THM	1.4 km	MPC · JPL
876202	2007 TK_{244}	—	October 8, 2007	Catalina	CSS	·	1.7 km	MPC · JPL
876203	2007 TJ_{249}	—	October 11, 2007	Mount Lemmon	Mount Lemmon Survey	AEO	820 m	MPC · JPL
876204	2007 TM_{249}	—	October 11, 2007	Mount Lemmon	Mount Lemmon Survey	·	660 m	MPC · JPL
876205	2007 TP_{255}	—	September 5, 2007	Mount Lemmon	Mount Lemmon Survey	·	830 m	MPC · JPL
876206	2007 TC_{267}	—	September 12, 2007	Mount Lemmon	Mount Lemmon Survey	·	2.6 km	MPC · JPL
876207	2007 TO_{271}	—	October 9, 2007	Kitt Peak	Spacewatch	·	420 m	MPC · JPL
876208	2007 TN_{273}	—	October 10, 2007	Mount Lemmon	Mount Lemmon Survey	V	470 m	MPC · JPL
876209	2007 TV_{277}	—	September 14, 2007	Mount Lemmon	Mount Lemmon Survey	NYS	430 m	MPC · JPL
876210	2007 TU_{278}	—	September 14, 2007	Mount Lemmon	Mount Lemmon Survey	LIX · critical	2.4 km	MPC · JPL
876211	2007 TY_{284}	—	October 9, 2007	Mount Lemmon	Mount Lemmon Survey	EUP	2.0 km	MPC · JPL
876212	2007 TA_{286}	—	October 4, 2007	Catalina	CSS	·	550 m	MPC · JPL
876213	2007 TB_{293}	—	September 25, 2007	Mount Lemmon	Mount Lemmon Survey	·	600 m	MPC · JPL
876214	2007 TM_{293}	—	October 9, 2007	Mount Lemmon	Mount Lemmon Survey	MAR	640 m	MPC · JPL
876215	2007 TR_{296}	—	October 10, 2007	Mount Lemmon	Mount Lemmon Survey	·	830 m	MPC · JPL
876216	2007 TF_{325}	—	October 11, 2007	Kitt Peak	Spacewatch	·	1.3 km	MPC · JPL
876217	2007 TD_{343}	—	October 10, 2007	Mount Lemmon	Mount Lemmon Survey	·	1.0 km	MPC · JPL
876218	2007 TE_{344}	—	October 10, 2007	Mount Lemmon	Mount Lemmon Survey	·	1.7 km	MPC · JPL
876219	2007 TM_{349}	—	September 4, 2007	Mount Lemmon	Mount Lemmon Survey	·	1.0 km	MPC · JPL
876220	2007 TO_{367}	—	October 10, 2007	Kitt Peak	Spacewatch	·	960 m	MPC · JPL
876221	2007 TV_{368}	—	October 11, 2007	Mount Lemmon	Mount Lemmon Survey	·	1.4 km	MPC · JPL
876222	2007 TV_{394}	—	October 15, 2007	Kitt Peak	Spacewatch	·	680 m	MPC · JPL
876223	2007 TC_{397}	—	October 15, 2007	Anderson Mesa	LONEOS	·	1.1 km	MPC · JPL
876224	2007 TJ_{399}	—	October 15, 2007	Kitt Peak	Spacewatch	·	590 m	MPC · JPL
876225	2007 TX_{427}	—	October 10, 2007	Kitt Peak	Spacewatch	T_{j} (2.97)	2.0 km	MPC · JPL
876226	2007 TP_{428}	—	October 11, 2007	Kitt Peak	Spacewatch	JUN	610 m	MPC · JPL
876227	2007 TB_{431}	—	October 10, 2007	Catalina	CSS	·	700 m	MPC · JPL
876228	2007 TG_{443}	—	September 26, 2007	Mount Lemmon	Mount Lemmon Survey	PHO	600 m	MPC · JPL
876229	2007 TP_{450}	—	October 12, 2007	Socorro	LINEAR	·	810 m	MPC · JPL
876230	2007 TR_{456}	—	October 7, 2007	Mount Lemmon	Mount Lemmon Survey	·	1.2 km	MPC · JPL
876231	2007 TP_{460}	—	August 25, 2012	Kitt Peak	Spacewatch	BRA	940 m	MPC · JPL
876232	2007 TA_{463}	—	October 10, 2007	Kitt Peak	Spacewatch	·	520 m	MPC · JPL
876233	2007 TG_{463}	—	August 25, 2014	Haleakala	Pan-STARRS 1	V	380 m	MPC · JPL
876234	2007 TT_{464}	—	October 9, 2007	Kitt Peak	Spacewatch	·	1.6 km	MPC · JPL
876235	2007 TB_{470}	—	June 19, 2012	ESA OGS	ESA OGS	TIR	2.0 km	MPC · JPL
876236	2007 TW_{477}	—	September 15, 2013	Mount Lemmon	Mount Lemmon Survey	·	2.3 km	MPC · JPL
876237	2007 TK_{484}	—	October 7, 2007	Mount Lemmon	Mount Lemmon Survey	·	1.9 km	MPC · JPL
876238	2007 TU_{484}	—	October 11, 2007	Catalina	CSS	·	1.1 km	MPC · JPL
876239	2007 TV_{484}	—	October 10, 2007	Mount Lemmon	Mount Lemmon Survey	·	1.4 km	MPC · JPL
876240	2007 TG_{485}	—	October 2, 2007	Kitt Peak	Spacewatch	·	1.0 km	MPC · JPL
876241	2007 TY_{485}	—	October 11, 2007	Kitt Peak	Spacewatch	·	1.1 km	MPC · JPL
876242	2007 TK_{487}	—	October 9, 2007	Mount Lemmon	Mount Lemmon Survey	NEM	1.3 km	MPC · JPL
876243	2007 TU_{487}	—	October 7, 2007	Mount Lemmon	Mount Lemmon Survey	JUN	720 m	MPC · JPL
876244	2007 TK_{490}	—	October 9, 2007	Mount Lemmon	Mount Lemmon Survey	·	1.1 km	MPC · JPL
876245	2007 TT_{490}	—	October 9, 2007	Kitt Peak	Spacewatch	·	1.2 km	MPC · JPL
876246	2007 TT_{492}	—	October 15, 2007	Mount Lemmon	Mount Lemmon Survey	·	1.2 km	MPC · JPL
876247	2007 TA_{493}	—	November 19, 2003	Palomar	NEAT	EUN	710 m	MPC · JPL
876248	2007 TZ_{497}	—	October 11, 2007	Mount Lemmon	Mount Lemmon Survey	T_{j} (2.97)	1.8 km	MPC · JPL
876249	2007 TN_{506}	—	October 12, 2007	Kitt Peak	Spacewatch	·	1.4 km	MPC · JPL
876250	2007 TG_{512}	—	October 15, 2007	Mount Lemmon	Mount Lemmon Survey	·	2.1 km	MPC · JPL
876251	2007 TH_{512}	—	October 4, 2007	Mount Lemmon	Mount Lemmon Survey	·	1.8 km	MPC · JPL
876252	2007 TL_{512}	—	October 12, 2007	Kitt Peak	Spacewatch	·	1.6 km	MPC · JPL
876253	2007 TS_{514}	—	October 4, 2007	Mount Lemmon	Mount Lemmon Survey	·	1.2 km	MPC · JPL
876254	2007 UQ_{2}	—	October 11, 2007	Mount Lemmon	Mount Lemmon Survey	·	2.1 km	MPC · JPL
876255	2007 UL_{5}	—	September 25, 2007	Mount Lemmon	Mount Lemmon Survey	JUN	700 m	MPC · JPL
876256	2007 UZ_{14}	—	September 21, 2007	Kitt Peak	Spacewatch	T_{j} (2.98) · EUP	2.2 km	MPC · JPL
876257	2007 UE_{22}	—	October 8, 2007	Kitt Peak	Spacewatch	·	750 m	MPC · JPL
876258	2007 US_{34}	—	October 9, 2007	Kitt Peak	Spacewatch	·	1.4 km	MPC · JPL
876259	2007 UG_{65}	—	October 31, 2007	Kitt Peak	Spacewatch	JUN	580 m	MPC · JPL
876260	2007 UX_{76}	—	October 31, 2007	Mount Lemmon	Mount Lemmon Survey	·	1.2 km	MPC · JPL
876261	2007 UY_{84}	—	September 14, 2007	Mount Lemmon	Mount Lemmon Survey	·	1.1 km	MPC · JPL
876262	2007 UK_{88}	—	October 30, 2007	Kitt Peak	Spacewatch	MAS	440 m	MPC · JPL
876263	2007 UE_{91}	—	October 15, 2007	Kitt Peak	Spacewatch	·	820 m	MPC · JPL
876264	2007 UK_{95}	—	October 19, 2007	Kitt Peak	Spacewatch	JUN	640 m	MPC · JPL
876265	2007 UD_{106}	—	October 31, 2007	Mount Lemmon	Mount Lemmon Survey	ADE	1.3 km	MPC · JPL
876266	2007 UJ_{107}	—	October 31, 2007	Kitt Peak	Spacewatch	T_{j} (2.91)	1.3 km	MPC · JPL
876267	2007 UC_{108}	—	October 30, 2007	Kitt Peak	Spacewatch	·	1.2 km	MPC · JPL
876268	2007 UE_{111}	—	October 30, 2007	Mount Lemmon	Mount Lemmon Survey	·	980 m	MPC · JPL
876269	2007 UJ_{118}	—	October 31, 2007	Mount Lemmon	Mount Lemmon Survey	·	900 m	MPC · JPL
876270	2007 UC_{122}	—	October 30, 2007	Kitt Peak	Spacewatch	·	1.2 km	MPC · JPL
876271	2007 UJ_{123}	—	October 10, 2007	Catalina	CSS	·	700 m	MPC · JPL
876272	2007 UU_{132}	—	October 20, 2007	Mount Lemmon	Mount Lemmon Survey	·	530 m	MPC · JPL
876273	2007 UF_{133}	—	October 21, 2007	Mount Lemmon	Mount Lemmon Survey	·	1.0 km	MPC · JPL
876274	2007 UK_{141}	—	October 30, 2007	Mount Lemmon	Mount Lemmon Survey	·	550 m	MPC · JPL
876275	2007 UE_{147}	—	October 19, 2007	Catalina	CSS	·	1.0 km	MPC · JPL
876276	2007 UY_{147}	—	October 20, 2007	Mount Lemmon	Mount Lemmon Survey	·	1.4 km	MPC · JPL
876277	2007 UZ_{147}	—	October 18, 2007	Kitt Peak	Spacewatch	·	540 m	MPC · JPL
876278	2007 UB_{151}	—	October 16, 2007	Mount Lemmon	Mount Lemmon Survey	EUN	830 m	MPC · JPL
876279	2007 UO_{157}	—	October 18, 2007	Kitt Peak	Spacewatch	·	700 m	MPC · JPL
876280	2007 UG_{158}	—	October 30, 2007	Kitt Peak	Spacewatch	·	1.2 km	MPC · JPL
876281	2007 UJ_{158}	—	October 18, 2007	Kitt Peak	Spacewatch	·	1.3 km	MPC · JPL
876282	2007 UU_{158}	—	October 20, 2007	Kitt Peak	Spacewatch	·	1.1 km	MPC · JPL
876283	2007 UE_{159}	—	October 24, 2007	Mount Lemmon	Mount Lemmon Survey	·	1.0 km	MPC · JPL
876284	2007 UR_{159}	—	October 16, 2007	Mount Lemmon	Mount Lemmon Survey	·	1.2 km	MPC · JPL
876285	2007 UM_{160}	—	October 16, 2007	Mount Lemmon	Mount Lemmon Survey	·	1.2 km	MPC · JPL
876286	2007 UO_{164}	—	October 30, 2007	Mount Lemmon	Mount Lemmon Survey	·	1.5 km	MPC · JPL
876287	2007 VG_{11}	—	November 2, 2007	Mount Lemmon	Mount Lemmon Survey	BAR	1.0 km	MPC · JPL
876288	2007 VS_{14}	—	October 9, 2007	Kitt Peak	Spacewatch	·	980 m	MPC · JPL
876289	2007 VY_{26}	—	September 18, 2007	Mount Lemmon	Mount Lemmon Survey	·	1.0 km	MPC · JPL
876290	2007 VP_{39}	—	October 12, 2007	Kitt Peak	Spacewatch	·	530 m	MPC · JPL
876291	2007 VW_{40}	—	October 13, 2007	Mount Lemmon	Mount Lemmon Survey	·	2.9 km	MPC · JPL
876292	2007 VY_{61}	—	November 1, 2007	Kitt Peak	Spacewatch	·	660 m	MPC · JPL
876293	2007 VU_{74}	—	October 7, 2007	Mount Lemmon	Mount Lemmon Survey	·	1.2 km	MPC · JPL
876294	2007 VN_{78}	—	October 20, 2007	Kitt Peak	Spacewatch	EUN	1.1 km	MPC · JPL
876295	2007 VT_{79}	—	November 3, 2007	Kitt Peak	Spacewatch	·	1.5 km	MPC · JPL
876296	2007 VW_{101}	—	November 2, 2007	Kitt Peak	Spacewatch	·	1.0 km	MPC · JPL
876297	2007 VE_{106}	—	November 3, 2007	Kitt Peak	Spacewatch	·	1.2 km	MPC · JPL
876298	2007 VO_{126}	—	November 1, 2007	Kitt Peak	Spacewatch	JUN	610 m	MPC · JPL
876299	2007 VE_{132}	—	November 2, 2007	Mount Lemmon	Mount Lemmon Survey	critical	1.2 km	MPC · JPL
876300	2007 VN_{137}	—	November 4, 2007	Mount Lemmon	Mount Lemmon Survey	·	640 m	MPC · JPL

== 876301–876400 ==
back to top

Designation			Discovery			Properties		Ref
Permanent	Provisional	Named after	Date	Site	Discoverer(s)	Category	Diam.	Ref
876301	2007 VP_{146}	—	November 4, 2007	Kitt Peak	Spacewatch	EUN	790 m	MPC · JPL
876302	2007 VM_{155}	—	September 18, 2007	Mount Lemmon	Mount Lemmon Survey	·	620 m	MPC · JPL
876303	2007 VC_{156}	—	November 5, 2007	Kitt Peak	Spacewatch	·	780 m	MPC · JPL
876304	2007 VJ_{162}	—	November 5, 2007	Kitt Peak	Spacewatch	·	1.3 km	MPC · JPL
876305	2007 VB_{173}	—	November 2, 2007	Mount Lemmon	Mount Lemmon Survey	EUN	790 m	MPC · JPL
876306	2007 VN_{174}	—	November 3, 2007	Mount Lemmon	Mount Lemmon Survey	PHO	870 m	MPC · JPL
876307	2007 VY_{176}	—	November 5, 2007	Mount Lemmon	Mount Lemmon Survey	·	1.3 km	MPC · JPL
876308	2007 VA_{199}	—	November 9, 2007	Mount Lemmon	Mount Lemmon Survey	·	1.2 km	MPC · JPL
876309	2007 VO_{200}	—	November 9, 2007	Mount Lemmon	Mount Lemmon Survey	·	2.0 km	MPC · JPL
876310	2007 VJ_{208}	—	October 18, 2007	Kitt Peak	Spacewatch	·	1 km	MPC · JPL
876311	2007 VU_{212}	—	November 9, 2007	Kitt Peak	Spacewatch	·	1.1 km	MPC · JPL
876312	2007 VD_{214}	—	October 20, 2007	Mount Lemmon	Mount Lemmon Survey	NEM	1.7 km	MPC · JPL
876313	2007 VD_{216}	—	November 9, 2007	Kitt Peak	Spacewatch	·	2.2 km	MPC · JPL
876314	2007 VW_{232}	—	November 7, 2007	Kitt Peak	Spacewatch	·	1.1 km	MPC · JPL
876315	2007 VZ_{233}	—	October 15, 2007	Kitt Peak	Spacewatch	·	1.3 km	MPC · JPL
876316	2007 VO_{239}	—	October 16, 2007	Mount Lemmon	Mount Lemmon Survey	·	570 m	MPC · JPL
876317	2007 VJ_{244}	—	October 15, 2007	Kitt Peak	Spacewatch	·	2.3 km	MPC · JPL
876318	2007 VL_{257}	—	October 18, 2007	Kitt Peak	Spacewatch	H	420 m	MPC · JPL
876319	2007 VL_{263}	—	October 14, 2007	Mount Lemmon	Mount Lemmon Survey	·	1.4 km	MPC · JPL
876320	2007 VL_{273}	—	October 14, 2007	Mount Lemmon	Mount Lemmon Survey	·	660 m	MPC · JPL
876321	2007 VE_{285}	—	November 14, 2007	Kitt Peak	Spacewatch	·	3.3 km	MPC · JPL
876322	2007 VC_{290}	—	November 1, 2007	Kitt Peak	Spacewatch	T_{j} (2.94)	2.1 km	MPC · JPL
876323	2007 VX_{299}	—	November 3, 2007	Lulin	LUSS	·	2.2 km	MPC · JPL
876324	2007 VN_{306}	—	November 1, 2007	Kitt Peak	Spacewatch	·	1.8 km	MPC · JPL
876325	2007 VQ_{306}	—	November 1, 2007	Kitt Peak	Spacewatch	·	1.3 km	MPC · JPL
876326	2007 VM_{312}	—	November 2, 2007	Kitt Peak	Spacewatch	·	1.2 km	MPC · JPL
876327	2007 VK_{313}	—	November 8, 2007	Kitt Peak	Spacewatch	·	1.1 km	MPC · JPL
876328	2007 VH_{325}	—	October 12, 2007	Mount Lemmon	Mount Lemmon Survey	·	2.1 km	MPC · JPL
876329	2007 VV_{335}	—	October 14, 2007	Mount Lemmon	Mount Lemmon Survey	·	920 m	MPC · JPL
876330	2007 VX_{340}	—	November 5, 2007	Mount Lemmon	Mount Lemmon Survey	PHO	710 m	MPC · JPL
876331	2007 VY_{344}	—	October 20, 2007	Mount Lemmon	Mount Lemmon Survey	·	670 m	MPC · JPL
876332	2007 VE_{347}	—	February 3, 2013	Haleakala	Pan-STARRS 1	·	1.4 km	MPC · JPL
876333	2007 VM_{347}	—	November 2, 2007	Kitt Peak	Spacewatch	·	1.9 km	MPC · JPL
876334	2007 VZ_{347}	—	November 5, 2007	Kitt Peak	Spacewatch	·	2.4 km	MPC · JPL
876335	2007 VD_{352}	—	September 21, 2011	Kitt Peak	Spacewatch	·	960 m	MPC · JPL
876336	2007 VG_{357}	—	November 5, 2007	Kitt Peak	Spacewatch	·	1.4 km	MPC · JPL
876337	2007 VG_{363}	—	November 3, 2007	Kitt Peak	Spacewatch	·	840 m	MPC · JPL
876338	2007 VU_{366}	—	November 7, 2007	Mount Lemmon	Mount Lemmon Survey	·	1.3 km	MPC · JPL
876339	2007 VR_{367}	—	November 2, 2007	Mount Lemmon	Mount Lemmon Survey	·	1.1 km	MPC · JPL
876340	2007 VA_{369}	—	November 1, 2007	Mount Lemmon	Mount Lemmon Survey	EUN	770 m	MPC · JPL
876341	2007 VG_{369}	—	November 11, 2007	Mount Lemmon	Mount Lemmon Survey	·	1.3 km	MPC · JPL
876342	2007 VG_{370}	—	November 8, 2007	Kitt Peak	Spacewatch	HNS	710 m	MPC · JPL
876343	2007 VX_{370}	—	November 2, 2007	Mount Lemmon	Mount Lemmon Survey	·	1.2 km	MPC · JPL
876344	2007 VY_{370}	—	November 13, 2007	Mount Lemmon	Mount Lemmon Survey	·	1.4 km	MPC · JPL
876345	2007 VR_{381}	—	November 2, 2007	Kitt Peak	Spacewatch	·	1.0 km	MPC · JPL
876346	2007 VM_{387}	—	November 3, 2007	Mount Lemmon	Mount Lemmon Survey	T_{j} (2.95)	2.7 km	MPC · JPL
876347	2007 VY_{388}	—	November 3, 2007	Mount Lemmon	Mount Lemmon Survey	·	1.5 km	MPC · JPL
876348	2007 WQ_{1}	—	November 9, 2007	Kitt Peak	Spacewatch	·	1.3 km	MPC · JPL
876349	2007 WM_{2}	—	November 16, 2007	Mount Lemmon	Mount Lemmon Survey	EUN	930 m	MPC · JPL
876350	2007 WQ_{9}	—	November 5, 2007	Mount Lemmon	Mount Lemmon Survey	PHO	720 m	MPC · JPL
876351	2007 WG_{14}	—	November 7, 2007	Kitt Peak	Spacewatch	MAS	490 m	MPC · JPL
876352	2007 WQ_{15}	—	November 18, 2007	Mount Lemmon	Mount Lemmon Survey	·	1.2 km	MPC · JPL
876353	2007 WX_{21}	—	November 17, 2007	Kitt Peak	Spacewatch	GEF	800 m	MPC · JPL
876354	2007 WY_{21}	—	November 17, 2007	Kitt Peak	Spacewatch	·	1.1 km	MPC · JPL
876355	2007 WP_{26}	—	November 2, 2007	Mount Lemmon	Mount Lemmon Survey	PHO	670 m	MPC · JPL
876356	2007 WB_{38}	—	October 18, 2007	Mount Lemmon	Mount Lemmon Survey	·	1.5 km	MPC · JPL
876357	2007 WF_{43}	—	November 19, 2007	Kitt Peak	Spacewatch	AEO	830 m	MPC · JPL
876358	2007 WZ_{52}	—	November 17, 2007	Mount Lemmon	Mount Lemmon Survey	·	1.3 km	MPC · JPL
876359	2007 WF_{58}	—	November 18, 2007	Mount Lemmon	Mount Lemmon Survey	·	920 m	MPC · JPL
876360	2007 WC_{65}	—	November 18, 2007	Mount Lemmon	Mount Lemmon Survey	·	990 m	MPC · JPL
876361	2007 WL_{71}	—	September 8, 2011	Kitt Peak	Spacewatch	·	1.1 km	MPC · JPL
876362	2007 WX_{72}	—	November 20, 2007	Kitt Peak	Spacewatch	·	1.5 km	MPC · JPL
876363	2007 WD_{73}	—	November 17, 2007	Kitt Peak	Spacewatch	·	840 m	MPC · JPL
876364	2007 WF_{74}	—	November 19, 2007	Mount Lemmon	Mount Lemmon Survey	·	1.4 km	MPC · JPL
876365	2007 XY_{17}	—	December 10, 2007	Socorro	LINEAR	·	1.4 km	MPC · JPL
876366	2007 XZ_{43}	—	December 15, 2007	Kitt Peak	Spacewatch	·	630 m	MPC · JPL
876367	2007 XF_{45}	—	December 15, 2007	Kitt Peak	Spacewatch	·	1.4 km	MPC · JPL
876368	2007 XO_{45}	—	December 15, 2007	Kitt Peak	Spacewatch	·	1.3 km	MPC · JPL
876369	2007 XZ_{60}	—	December 4, 2007	Mount Lemmon	Mount Lemmon Survey	PHO	750 m	MPC · JPL
876370	2007 XX_{61}	—	November 1, 2007	Kitt Peak	Spacewatch	·	660 m	MPC · JPL
876371	2007 XM_{64}	—	December 5, 2007	Kitt Peak	Spacewatch	·	1.4 km	MPC · JPL
876372	2007 YJ_{5}	—	December 6, 2007	Mount Lemmon	Mount Lemmon Survey	MAS	500 m	MPC · JPL
876373	2007 YH_{9}	—	December 16, 2007	Mount Lemmon	Mount Lemmon Survey	H	330 m	MPC · JPL
876374	2007 YL_{21}	—	December 16, 2007	Kitt Peak	Spacewatch	·	1.3 km	MPC · JPL
876375	2007 YF_{33}	—	November 5, 2007	Kitt Peak	Spacewatch	·	1.2 km	MPC · JPL
876376	2007 YJ_{76}	—	December 17, 2007	Mount Lemmon	Mount Lemmon Survey	·	1.6 km	MPC · JPL
876377	2007 YN_{89}	—	December 18, 2007	Mount Lemmon	Mount Lemmon Survey	·	810 m	MPC · JPL
876378	2007 YN_{90}	—	December 18, 2007	Mount Lemmon	Mount Lemmon Survey	·	1.5 km	MPC · JPL
876379	2007 YZ_{92}	—	December 18, 2007	Mount Lemmon	Mount Lemmon Survey	·	1.4 km	MPC · JPL
876380	2007 YP_{93}	—	December 30, 2007	Mount Lemmon	Mount Lemmon Survey	·	1.4 km	MPC · JPL
876381	2008 AX_{64}	—	January 11, 2008	Mount Lemmon	Mount Lemmon Survey	DOR	1.7 km	MPC · JPL
876382	2008 AK_{89}	—	December 30, 2007	Kitt Peak	Spacewatch	·	1.1 km	MPC · JPL
876383	2008 AD_{103}	—	December 28, 2007	Kitt Peak	Spacewatch	DOR	1.7 km	MPC · JPL
876384	2008 AN_{106}	—	December 18, 2007	Kitt Peak	Spacewatch	·	1.3 km	MPC · JPL
876385	2008 AH_{108}	—	January 15, 2008	Mount Lemmon	Mount Lemmon Survey	·	1.4 km	MPC · JPL
876386	2008 AV_{114}	—	January 1, 2008	Kitt Peak	Spacewatch	DOR	1.8 km	MPC · JPL
876387	2008 AN_{125}	—	January 6, 2008	Mauna Kea	P. A. Wiegert	·	380 m	MPC · JPL
876388	2008 AK_{139}	—	January 10, 2008	Mount Lemmon	Mount Lemmon Survey	·	1.3 km	MPC · JPL
876389	2008 AZ_{148}	—	January 13, 2008	Kitt Peak	Spacewatch	·	1.3 km	MPC · JPL
876390	2008 AS_{154}	—	January 1, 2008	Kitt Peak	Spacewatch	(13314)	1.3 km	MPC · JPL
876391	2008 AS_{156}	—	January 14, 2008	Kitt Peak	Spacewatch	·	830 m	MPC · JPL
876392	2008 BV_{11}	—	January 18, 2008	Mount Lemmon	Mount Lemmon Survey	·	1.1 km	MPC · JPL
876393	2008 BP_{16}	—	January 30, 2008	Mount Lemmon	Mount Lemmon Survey	ATE	150 m	MPC · JPL
876394	2008 BK_{28}	—	January 30, 2008	Mount Lemmon	Mount Lemmon Survey	·	1.3 km	MPC · JPL
876395	2008 BL_{55}	—	January 19, 2008	Mount Lemmon	Mount Lemmon Survey	·	820 m	MPC · JPL
876396	2008 BV_{56}	—	January 18, 2008	Kitt Peak	Spacewatch	·	1.1 km	MPC · JPL
876397	2008 CT_{15}	—	January 20, 2008	Mount Lemmon	Mount Lemmon Survey	·	1.2 km	MPC · JPL
876398	2008 CJ_{27}	—	February 2, 2008	Kitt Peak	Spacewatch	·	770 m	MPC · JPL
876399	2008 CE_{45}	—	February 2, 2008	Kitt Peak	Spacewatch	DOR	1.8 km	MPC · JPL
876400	2008 CG_{55}	—	February 7, 2008	Mount Lemmon	Mount Lemmon Survey	·	740 m	MPC · JPL

== 876401–876500 ==
back to top

Designation			Discovery			Properties		Ref
Permanent	Provisional	Named after	Date	Site	Discoverer(s)	Category	Diam.	Ref
876401	2008 CJ_{63}	—	February 8, 2008	Mount Lemmon	Mount Lemmon Survey	·	1.4 km	MPC · JPL
876402	2008 CP_{65}	—	February 8, 2008	Mount Lemmon	Mount Lemmon Survey	·	910 m	MPC · JPL
876403	2008 CD_{69}	—	February 3, 2008	Bergisch Gladbach	W. Bickel	·	1.6 km	MPC · JPL
876404	2008 CJ_{80}	—	February 7, 2008	Kitt Peak	Spacewatch	DOR	1.7 km	MPC · JPL
876405	2008 CS_{82}	—	December 31, 2007	Kitt Peak	Spacewatch	·	1.3 km	MPC · JPL
876406	2008 CU_{102}	—	February 9, 2008	Mount Lemmon	Mount Lemmon Survey	·	1.2 km	MPC · JPL
876407	2008 CL_{104}	—	January 10, 2008	Mount Lemmon	Mount Lemmon Survey	·	1.2 km	MPC · JPL
876408	2008 CX_{154}	—	February 9, 2008	Kitt Peak	Spacewatch	·	1.8 km	MPC · JPL
876409	2008 CU_{158}	—	February 9, 2008	Kitt Peak	Spacewatch	·	1.4 km	MPC · JPL
876410	2008 CS_{176}	—	January 20, 2008	Mount Lemmon	Mount Lemmon Survey	·	1.8 km	MPC · JPL
876411	2008 CV_{192}	—	February 7, 2008	Mount Lemmon	Mount Lemmon Survey	AEO	880 m	MPC · JPL
876412	2008 CM_{212}	—	February 8, 2008	Mount Lemmon	Mount Lemmon Survey	·	1.2 km	MPC · JPL
876413	2008 CC_{231}	—	October 13, 2015	Mount Lemmon	Mount Lemmon Survey	·	1.4 km	MPC · JPL
876414	2008 CB_{232}	—	February 2, 2008	Kitt Peak	Spacewatch	THB · critical	1.9 km	MPC · JPL
876415	2008 CQ_{236}	—	November 21, 2014	Haleakala	Pan-STARRS 1	·	880 m	MPC · JPL
876416	2008 CK_{242}	—	February 8, 2008	Mount Lemmon	Mount Lemmon Survey	CLO	1.4 km	MPC · JPL
876417	2008 CL_{242}	—	February 3, 2008	Kitt Peak	Spacewatch	·	1.6 km	MPC · JPL
876418	2008 DW_{69}	—	February 24, 2008	Kitt Peak	Spacewatch	·	1.3 km	MPC · JPL
876419	2008 DR_{92}	—	February 28, 2008	Kitt Peak	Spacewatch	·	1.4 km	MPC · JPL
876420	2008 EZ_{13}	—	March 1, 2008	Kitt Peak	Spacewatch	·	1.5 km	MPC · JPL
876421	2008 EC_{41}	—	March 4, 2008	Kitt Peak	Spacewatch	·	1.4 km	MPC · JPL
876422	2008 ET_{43}	—	March 5, 2008	Mount Lemmon	Mount Lemmon Survey	DOR	1.5 km	MPC · JPL
876423	2008 EB_{50}	—	February 28, 2008	Mount Lemmon	Mount Lemmon Survey	·	680 m	MPC · JPL
876424	2008 EU_{55}	—	January 12, 2008	Socorro	LINEAR	H	450 m	MPC · JPL
876425	2008 ER_{96}	—	February 1, 2008	Kitt Peak	Spacewatch	·	1.3 km	MPC · JPL
876426	2008 EW_{175}	—	March 6, 2008	Mount Lemmon	Mount Lemmon Survey	V	490 m	MPC · JPL
876427	2008 ED_{179}	—	August 22, 2014	Haleakala	Pan-STARRS 1	·	740 m	MPC · JPL
876428	2008 EL_{179}	—	January 18, 2008	Mount Lemmon	Mount Lemmon Survey	·	1.3 km	MPC · JPL
876429	2008 EV_{183}	—	March 10, 2008	Siding Spring	SSS	·	960 m	MPC · JPL
876430	2008 EY_{194}	—	March 3, 2008	XuYi	PMO NEO Survey Program	critical	850 m	MPC · JPL
876431	2008 FZ_{7}	—	February 10, 2008	Kitt Peak	Spacewatch	·	1.7 km	MPC · JPL
876432	2008 FM_{16}	—	February 13, 2008	Mount Lemmon	Mount Lemmon Survey	·	1.7 km	MPC · JPL
876433	2008 FY_{56}	—	March 28, 2008	Mount Lemmon	Mount Lemmon Survey	THM	1.5 km	MPC · JPL
876434	2008 FY_{64}	—	March 28, 2008	Kitt Peak	Spacewatch	·	820 m	MPC · JPL
876435	2008 FJ_{113}	—	March 31, 2008	Kitt Peak	Spacewatch	H	270 m	MPC · JPL
876436	2008 GU_{61}	—	April 5, 2008	Mount Lemmon	Mount Lemmon Survey	·	2.0 km	MPC · JPL
876437	2008 GC_{119}	—	April 3, 2008	Kitt Peak	Spacewatch	·	1.5 km	MPC · JPL
876438	2008 GW_{153}	—	April 1, 2008	Mount Lemmon	Mount Lemmon Survey	·	1.5 km	MPC · JPL
876439	2008 GY_{160}	—	April 3, 2008	Kitt Peak	Spacewatch	·	430 m	MPC · JPL
876440	2008 GV_{172}	—	April 6, 2008	Kitt Peak	Spacewatch	·	1.6 km	MPC · JPL
876441	2008 HR_{9}	—	April 6, 2008	Mount Lemmon	Mount Lemmon Survey	·	1.2 km	MPC · JPL
876442	2008 HT_{9}	—	April 15, 2008	Mount Lemmon	Mount Lemmon Survey	PHO	600 m	MPC · JPL
876443	2008 HG_{15}	—	April 25, 2008	Kitt Peak	Spacewatch	H	440 m	MPC · JPL
876444	2008 HY_{65}	—	April 30, 2008	Kitt Peak	Spacewatch	·	1.5 km	MPC · JPL
876445	2008 JB	—	April 12, 2008	Kitt Peak	Spacewatch	H	430 m	MPC · JPL
876446	2008 KQ	—	May 27, 2008	Kitt Peak	Spacewatch	AMO	290 m	MPC · JPL
876447	2008 KW_{10}	—	May 5, 2008	Mount Lemmon	Mount Lemmon Survey	·	840 m	MPC · JPL
876448	2008 KE_{17}	—	May 3, 2008	Mount Lemmon	Mount Lemmon Survey	·	700 m	MPC · JPL
876449	2008 KR_{21}	—	April 27, 2008	Kitt Peak	Spacewatch	·	1.6 km	MPC · JPL
876450	2008 KU_{47}	—	October 28, 2014	Haleakala	Pan-STARRS 1	·	1.8 km	MPC · JPL
876451	2008 KP_{48}	—	May 28, 2008	Desert Eagle	W. K. Y. Yeung	·	800 m	MPC · JPL
876452	2008 LS_{9}	—	May 28, 2008	Kitt Peak	Spacewatch	·	690 m	MPC · JPL
876453	2008 LQ_{16}	—	June 14, 2008	Socorro	LINEAR	APO	330 m	MPC · JPL
876454	2008 LX_{16}	—	June 15, 2008	Siding Spring	SSS	·	440 m	MPC · JPL
876455	2008 OH_{23}	—	July 30, 2008	Kitt Peak	Spacewatch	·	2.3 km	MPC · JPL
876456	2008 OP_{27}	—	February 10, 2014	Mount Lemmon	Mount Lemmon Survey	·	1.1 km	MPC · JPL
876457	2008 OL_{28}	—	July 30, 2008	Mount Lemmon	Mount Lemmon Survey	critical	2.2 km	MPC · JPL
876458	2008 OD_{33}	—	July 29, 2008	Mount Lemmon	Mount Lemmon Survey	·	710 m	MPC · JPL
876459	2008 PH	—	July 30, 2008	Catalina	CSS	·	990 m	MPC · JPL
876460	2008 PP_{4}	—	August 5, 2008	Punaʻauia	S. F. Hönig, N. Teamo	·	1.1 km	MPC · JPL
876461	2008 PA_{13}	—	July 30, 2008	Mount Lemmon	Mount Lemmon Survey	EUN	910 m	MPC · JPL
876462	2008 PR_{13}	—	August 10, 2008	Dauban	C. Rinner, F. Kugel	·	1.0 km	MPC · JPL
876463	2008 QJ_{38}	—	August 23, 2008	Kitt Peak	Spacewatch	·	1.9 km	MPC · JPL
876464	2008 QU_{48}	—	September 3, 2008	Kitt Peak	Spacewatch	·	1.0 km	MPC · JPL
876465	2008 QS_{49}	—	August 24, 2008	Črni Vrh	Skvarč, J.	·	2.2 km	MPC · JPL
876466	2008 QR_{50}	—	August 24, 2008	Kitt Peak	Spacewatch	·	1.6 km	MPC · JPL
876467	2008 RW_{10}	—	September 3, 2008	Kitt Peak	Spacewatch	·	1.1 km	MPC · JPL
876468	2008 RE_{11}	—	October 2, 1995	Kitt Peak	Spacewatch	·	950 m	MPC · JPL
876469	2008 RR_{12}	—	December 3, 2005	Mauna Kea	A. Boattini	·	800 m	MPC · JPL
876470	2008 RV_{25}	—	September 7, 2008	El Boalo	Hermosa, A. d. l.	EUN	820 m	MPC · JPL
876471	2008 RX_{25}	—	November 18, 2004	Siding Spring	SSS	·	1.2 km	MPC · JPL
876472	2008 RL_{31}	—	September 2, 2008	Kitt Peak	Spacewatch	MAS	490 m	MPC · JPL
876473	2008 RP_{32}	—	September 2, 2008	Kitt Peak	Spacewatch	·	1.6 km	MPC · JPL
876474	2008 RE_{33}	—	September 2, 2008	Kitt Peak	Spacewatch	·	2.0 km	MPC · JPL
876475	2008 RZ_{42}	—	September 2, 2008	Kitt Peak	Spacewatch	·	1.9 km	MPC · JPL
876476	2008 RN_{46}	—	September 2, 2008	Kitt Peak	Spacewatch	·	1.5 km	MPC · JPL
876477	2008 RD_{47}	—	September 2, 2008	Kitt Peak	Spacewatch	·	1.2 km	MPC · JPL
876478	2008 RK_{54}	—	September 3, 2008	Kitt Peak	Spacewatch	·	790 m	MPC · JPL
876479	2008 RL_{57}	—	September 3, 2008	Kitt Peak	Spacewatch	MAR	650 m	MPC · JPL
876480	2008 RR_{76}	—	September 6, 2008	Mount Lemmon	Mount Lemmon Survey	LIX	2.1 km	MPC · JPL
876481	2008 RT_{86}	—	September 5, 2008	Kitt Peak	Spacewatch	THB	1.6 km	MPC · JPL
876482	2008 RL_{87}	—	September 5, 2008	Kitt Peak	Spacewatch	·	980 m	MPC · JPL
876483	2008 RQ_{89}	—	September 5, 2008	Kitt Peak	Spacewatch	·	1.7 km	MPC · JPL
876484	2008 RD_{103}	—	September 5, 2008	Kitt Peak	Spacewatch	·	550 m	MPC · JPL
876485	2008 RX_{110}	—	September 3, 2008	Kitt Peak	Spacewatch	THM	1.9 km	MPC · JPL
876486	2008 RC_{119}	—	September 3, 2008	La Sagra	OAM	·	2.6 km	MPC · JPL
876487	2008 RT_{122}	—	September 5, 2008	Kitt Peak	Spacewatch	·	1.6 km	MPC · JPL
876488	2008 RA_{130}	—	September 7, 2008	Catalina	CSS	·	2.5 km	MPC · JPL
876489	2008 RH_{148}	—	September 3, 2008	Kitt Peak	Spacewatch	·	1.7 km	MPC · JPL
876490	2008 RP_{148}	—	September 5, 2008	Kitt Peak	Spacewatch	·	2.0 km	MPC · JPL
876491	2008 RB_{154}	—	September 4, 2008	Kitt Peak	Spacewatch	·	1.2 km	MPC · JPL
876492	2008 RF_{155}	—	September 4, 2008	Kitt Peak	Spacewatch	·	1 km	MPC · JPL
876493	2008 RV_{155}	—	September 4, 2008	Kitt Peak	Spacewatch	·	1.9 km	MPC · JPL
876494	2008 RJ_{157}	—	September 3, 2008	Kitt Peak	Spacewatch	·	2.1 km	MPC · JPL
876495	2008 RX_{157}	—	September 4, 2008	Kitt Peak	Spacewatch	·	1.8 km	MPC · JPL
876496	2008 RL_{158}	—	September 3, 2008	Kitt Peak	Spacewatch	·	2.1 km	MPC · JPL
876497	2008 RY_{158}	—	November 21, 2014	Mount Lemmon	Mount Lemmon Survey	EOS	1.3 km	MPC · JPL
876498	2008 RP_{160}	—	September 6, 2008	Mount Lemmon	Mount Lemmon Survey	·	1.6 km	MPC · JPL
876499	2008 RJ_{163}	—	September 6, 2008	Mount Lemmon	Mount Lemmon Survey	·	2.1 km	MPC · JPL
876500	2008 RT_{167}	—	September 4, 2008	Kitt Peak	Spacewatch	·	1.4 km	MPC · JPL

== 876501–876600 ==
back to top

Designation			Discovery			Properties		Ref
Permanent	Provisional	Named after	Date	Site	Discoverer(s)	Category	Diam.	Ref
876501	2008 RV_{174}	—	September 5, 2008	Kitt Peak	Spacewatch	·	960 m	MPC · JPL
876502	2008 RX_{180}	—	September 7, 2008	Mount Lemmon	Mount Lemmon Survey	critical	1.0 km	MPC · JPL
876503	2008 RJ_{182}	—	September 4, 2008	Kitt Peak	Spacewatch	·	880 m	MPC · JPL
876504	2008 RR_{182}	—	September 6, 2008	Catalina	CSS	·	840 m	MPC · JPL
876505	2008 RX_{182}	—	September 6, 2008	Mount Lemmon	Mount Lemmon Survey	LIX	2.3 km	MPC · JPL
876506	2008 RE_{183}	—	September 7, 2008	Mount Lemmon	Mount Lemmon Survey	MAR	570 m	MPC · JPL
876507	2008 SP_{10}	—	September 6, 2008	Mount Lemmon	Mount Lemmon Survey	T_{j} (2.96)	2.8 km	MPC · JPL
876508	2008 SQ_{11}	—	September 3, 2008	Kitt Peak	Spacewatch	·	870 m	MPC · JPL
876509	2008 SM_{25}	—	August 21, 2008	Kitt Peak	Spacewatch	MAS	580 m	MPC · JPL
876510	2008 SD_{33}	—	September 20, 2008	Mount Lemmon	Mount Lemmon Survey	·	2.1 km	MPC · JPL
876511	2008 SC_{40}	—	September 20, 2008	Kitt Peak	Spacewatch	EUN	1.0 km	MPC · JPL
876512	2008 SG_{42}	—	September 20, 2008	Kitt Peak	Spacewatch	NYS	910 m	MPC · JPL
876513	2008 SW_{51}	—	September 20, 2008	Mount Lemmon	Mount Lemmon Survey	AEO	750 m	MPC · JPL
876514	2008 SW_{52}	—	September 2, 2008	Kitt Peak	Spacewatch	·	1.6 km	MPC · JPL
876515	2008 SS_{54}	—	September 20, 2008	Mount Lemmon	Mount Lemmon Survey	·	740 m	MPC · JPL
876516	2008 SP_{70}	—	September 7, 2008	Mount Lemmon	Mount Lemmon Survey	critical	1.3 km	MPC · JPL
876517	2008 SK_{81}	—	September 23, 2008	Mount Lemmon	Mount Lemmon Survey	·	1.9 km	MPC · JPL
876518	2008 SG_{86}	—	September 20, 2008	Kitt Peak	Spacewatch	·	1.1 km	MPC · JPL
876519	2008 SU_{86}	—	September 5, 2008	Kitt Peak	Spacewatch	·	2.2 km	MPC · JPL
876520	2008 SM_{88}	—	September 7, 2008	Mount Lemmon	Mount Lemmon Survey	·	1.1 km	MPC · JPL
876521	2008 SK_{90}	—	September 21, 2008	Kitt Peak	Spacewatch	·	820 m	MPC · JPL
876522	2008 SJ_{96}	—	September 6, 2008	Mount Lemmon	Mount Lemmon Survey	H	460 m	MPC · JPL
876523	2008 SO_{101}	—	September 21, 2008	Kitt Peak	Spacewatch	·	970 m	MPC · JPL
876524	2008 SR_{101}	—	September 21, 2008	Kitt Peak	Spacewatch	·	950 m	MPC · JPL
876525	2008 SV_{101}	—	September 21, 2008	Mount Lemmon	Mount Lemmon Survey	·	2.7 km	MPC · JPL
876526	2008 SU_{113}	—	September 22, 2008	Kitt Peak	Spacewatch	·	2.2 km	MPC · JPL
876527	2008 SR_{115}	—	September 22, 2008	Kitt Peak	Spacewatch	critical	910 m	MPC · JPL
876528	2008 SR_{120}	—	September 22, 2008	Mount Lemmon	Mount Lemmon Survey	·	450 m	MPC · JPL
876529	2008 SX_{120}	—	September 22, 2008	Mount Lemmon	Mount Lemmon Survey	critical	1.2 km	MPC · JPL
876530	2008 SL_{121}	—	September 22, 2008	Mount Lemmon	Mount Lemmon Survey	·	800 m	MPC · JPL
876531	2008 SO_{121}	—	September 22, 2008	Mount Lemmon	Mount Lemmon Survey	·	830 m	MPC · JPL
876532	2008 SH_{122}	—	September 22, 2008	Mount Lemmon	Mount Lemmon Survey	·	2.1 km	MPC · JPL
876533	2008 SK_{122}	—	September 22, 2008	Mount Lemmon	Mount Lemmon Survey	·	1.9 km	MPC · JPL
876534	2008 SS_{126}	—	September 22, 2008	Kitt Peak	Spacewatch	TIR	1.4 km	MPC · JPL
876535	2008 SO_{130}	—	September 22, 2008	Kitt Peak	Spacewatch	·	2.5 km	MPC · JPL
876536	2008 SW_{135}	—	September 23, 2008	Mount Lemmon	Mount Lemmon Survey	DOR	1.4 km	MPC · JPL
876537	2008 SS_{137}	—	September 23, 2008	Kitt Peak	Spacewatch	MIS	1.5 km	MPC · JPL
876538	2008 SD_{141}	—	September 24, 2008	Mount Lemmon	Mount Lemmon Survey	EOS	1.2 km	MPC · JPL
876539	2008 SZ_{144}	—	September 26, 2008	Mount Lemmon	Mount Lemmon Survey	·	1 km	MPC · JPL
876540	2008 SO_{145}	—	September 21, 2008	Catalina	CSS	·	510 m	MPC · JPL
876541	2008 SR_{146}	—	September 23, 2008	Kitt Peak	Spacewatch	·	2.1 km	MPC · JPL
876542	2008 SZ_{151}	—	September 21, 2008	Catalina	CSS	·	1.1 km	MPC · JPL
876543	2008 SV_{154}	—	September 4, 2008	Kitt Peak	Spacewatch	·	1.4 km	MPC · JPL
876544	2008 SJ_{157}	—	September 6, 2008	Kitt Peak	Spacewatch	·	990 m	MPC · JPL
876545	2008 SS_{162}	—	September 19, 2008	Kitt Peak	Spacewatch	·	540 m	MPC · JPL
876546	2008 SH_{163}	—	September 19, 2008	Kitt Peak	Spacewatch	·	480 m	MPC · JPL
876547	2008 SG_{164}	—	September 21, 2008	Catalina	CSS	·	970 m	MPC · JPL
876548	2008 SG_{172}	—	September 5, 2008	Kitt Peak	Spacewatch	·	460 m	MPC · JPL
876549	2008 SJ_{178}	—	September 23, 2008	Kitt Peak	Spacewatch	TIR	1.6 km	MPC · JPL
876550	2008 SU_{185}	—	September 5, 2008	Kitt Peak	Spacewatch	PHO	670 m	MPC · JPL
876551	2008 SL_{187}	—	September 25, 2008	Kitt Peak	Spacewatch	·	1.2 km	MPC · JPL
876552	2008 SP_{188}	—	September 25, 2008	Kitt Peak	Spacewatch	·	1.6 km	MPC · JPL
876553	2008 SD_{189}	—	September 5, 2008	Kitt Peak	Spacewatch	·	640 m	MPC · JPL
876554	2008 SV_{189}	—	September 25, 2008	Kitt Peak	Spacewatch	EOS	1.4 km	MPC · JPL
876555	2008 SC_{197}	—	September 7, 2008	Mount Lemmon	Mount Lemmon Survey	·	880 m	MPC · JPL
876556	2008 SG_{207}	—	September 26, 2008	Bergisch Gladbach	W. Bickel	·	790 m	MPC · JPL
876557	2008 SR_{209}	—	September 3, 2008	Kitt Peak	Spacewatch	·	2.0 km	MPC · JPL
876558	2008 SA_{246}	—	September 6, 2008	Mount Lemmon	Mount Lemmon Survey	·	1.3 km	MPC · JPL
876559	2008 SV_{249}	—	September 23, 2008	Catalina	CSS	·	850 m	MPC · JPL
876560	2008 SY_{262}	—	September 24, 2008	Kitt Peak	Spacewatch	·	2.1 km	MPC · JPL
876561	2008 SD_{270}	—	September 23, 2008	Mount Lemmon	Mount Lemmon Survey	·	1.9 km	MPC · JPL
876562	2008 SC_{272}	—	September 29, 2008	Mount Lemmon	Mount Lemmon Survey	·	960 m	MPC · JPL
876563	2008 SL_{277}	—	September 24, 2008	Kitt Peak	Spacewatch	THM	1.5 km	MPC · JPL
876564	2008 SU_{287}	—	September 23, 2008	Mount Lemmon	Mount Lemmon Survey	·	510 m	MPC · JPL
876565	2008 SK_{289}	—	September 25, 2008	Kitt Peak	Spacewatch	·	1.1 km	MPC · JPL
876566	2008 SL_{313}	—	September 29, 2008	Kitt Peak	Spacewatch	·	1.5 km	MPC · JPL
876567	2008 SQ_{316}	—	April 26, 2011	Mount Lemmon	Mount Lemmon Survey	·	550 m	MPC · JPL
876568	2008 SD_{325}	—	September 29, 2008	Mount Lemmon	Mount Lemmon Survey	critical	2.1 km	MPC · JPL
876569	2008 SE_{326}	—	September 29, 2008	Mount Lemmon	Mount Lemmon Survey	T_{j} (2.98)	2.6 km	MPC · JPL
876570	2008 SB_{327}	—	September 19, 2008	Kitt Peak	Spacewatch	MAS	490 m	MPC · JPL
876571	2008 SH_{327}	—	October 28, 2014	Haleakala	Pan-STARRS 1	·	1.8 km	MPC · JPL
876572	2008 SJ_{328}	—	September 23, 2008	Mount Lemmon	Mount Lemmon Survey	·	1.8 km	MPC · JPL
876573	2008 SN_{328}	—	September 24, 2008	Mount Lemmon	Mount Lemmon Survey	·	2.0 km	MPC · JPL
876574	2008 SY_{328}	—	September 23, 2008	Mount Lemmon	Mount Lemmon Survey	(5)	720 m	MPC · JPL
876575	2008 SR_{329}	—	September 24, 2008	Mount Lemmon	Mount Lemmon Survey	H	420 m	MPC · JPL
876576	2008 SD_{332}	—	November 13, 2012	Mount Lemmon	Mount Lemmon Survey	·	770 m	MPC · JPL
876577	2008 SD_{335}	—	September 26, 2008	Kitt Peak	Spacewatch	·	2.3 km	MPC · JPL
876578	2008 SM_{335}	—	September 22, 2008	Mount Lemmon	Mount Lemmon Survey	(5)	820 m	MPC · JPL
876579	2008 SC_{338}	—	September 29, 2008	Mount Lemmon	Mount Lemmon Survey	·	1.9 km	MPC · JPL
876580	2008 SF_{338}	—	March 10, 2016	Haleakala	Pan-STARRS 1	·	1.4 km	MPC · JPL
876581	2008 SG_{346}	—	September 23, 2008	Mount Lemmon	Mount Lemmon Survey	(5)	920 m	MPC · JPL
876582	2008 SV_{346}	—	September 22, 2008	Mount Lemmon	Mount Lemmon Survey	·	1.8 km	MPC · JPL
876583	2008 SA_{352}	—	September 24, 2008	Mount Lemmon	Mount Lemmon Survey	·	1.7 km	MPC · JPL
876584	2008 SN_{356}	—	September 19, 2008	Kitt Peak	Spacewatch	TIR	1.9 km	MPC · JPL
876585	2008 SU_{356}	—	September 28, 2008	Mount Lemmon	Mount Lemmon Survey	·	900 m	MPC · JPL
876586	2008 SY_{357}	—	September 24, 2008	Mount Lemmon	Mount Lemmon Survey	·	850 m	MPC · JPL
876587	2008 SD_{366}	—	September 29, 2008	Mount Lemmon	Mount Lemmon Survey	·	1.2 km	MPC · JPL
876588	2008 TD_{2}	—	October 3, 2008	Mount Lemmon	Mount Lemmon Survey	AMO	130 m	MPC · JPL
876589	2008 TX_{25}	—	October 8, 2008	Kitt Peak	Spacewatch	·	910 m	MPC · JPL
876590	2008 TJ_{29}	—	October 1, 2008	Catalina	CSS	(5)	1.1 km	MPC · JPL
876591	2008 TA_{34}	—	September 20, 2008	Kitt Peak	Spacewatch	JUN	650 m	MPC · JPL
876592	2008 TQ_{34}	—	September 6, 2008	Kitt Peak	Spacewatch	·	990 m	MPC · JPL
876593	2008 TA_{38}	—	September 5, 2008	Kitt Peak	Spacewatch	EOS	1.2 km	MPC · JPL
876594	2008 TG_{42}	—	October 1, 2008	Mount Lemmon	Mount Lemmon Survey	·	2.0 km	MPC · JPL
876595	2008 TS_{45}	—	October 1, 2008	Kitt Peak	Spacewatch	·	1.1 km	MPC · JPL
876596	2008 TA_{52}	—	October 2, 2008	Kitt Peak	Spacewatch	·	2.2 km	MPC · JPL
876597	2008 TN_{52}	—	September 20, 2008	Kitt Peak	Spacewatch	·	1.5 km	MPC · JPL
876598	2008 TS_{60}	—	September 22, 2008	Mount Lemmon	Mount Lemmon Survey	·	930 m	MPC · JPL
876599	2008 TH_{66}	—	October 2, 2008	Kitt Peak	Spacewatch	·	1.7 km	MPC · JPL
876600	2008 TM_{66}	—	October 2, 2008	Kitt Peak	Spacewatch	·	870 m	MPC · JPL

== 876601–876700 ==
back to top

Designation			Discovery			Properties		Ref
Permanent	Provisional	Named after	Date	Site	Discoverer(s)	Category	Diam.	Ref
876601	2008 TQ_{72}	—	October 2, 2008	Kitt Peak	Spacewatch	·	810 m	MPC · JPL
876602	2008 TU_{75}	—	October 2, 2008	Kitt Peak	Spacewatch	·	460 m	MPC · JPL
876603	2008 TP_{83}	—	October 8, 2004	Kitt Peak	Spacewatch	(5)	890 m	MPC · JPL
876604	2008 TV_{83}	—	September 6, 2008	Mount Lemmon	Mount Lemmon Survey	·	2.2 km	MPC · JPL
876605	2008 TX_{84}	—	September 20, 2008	Mount Lemmon	Mount Lemmon Survey	NYS	830 m	MPC · JPL
876606	2008 TB_{89}	—	September 22, 2008	Mount Lemmon	Mount Lemmon Survey	·	1.6 km	MPC · JPL
876607	2008 TF_{89}	—	September 22, 2008	Kitt Peak	Spacewatch	·	930 m	MPC · JPL
876608	2008 TR_{90}	—	September 23, 2008	Kitt Peak	Spacewatch	·	960 m	MPC · JPL
876609	2008 TJ_{91}	—	September 29, 2008	Catalina	CSS	·	1.0 km	MPC · JPL
876610	2008 TP_{92}	—	October 8, 2008	Catalina	CSS	·	1.2 km	MPC · JPL
876611	2008 TB_{96}	—	September 5, 2008	Kitt Peak	Spacewatch	·	1.6 km	MPC · JPL
876612	2008 TA_{100}	—	September 6, 2008	Mount Lemmon	Mount Lemmon Survey	·	1.6 km	MPC · JPL
876613	2008 TL_{102}	—	September 6, 2008	Mount Lemmon	Mount Lemmon Survey	THM	1.8 km	MPC · JPL
876614	2008 TQ_{103}	—	October 6, 2008	Kitt Peak	Spacewatch	THM	1.5 km	MPC · JPL
876615	2008 TS_{107}	—	September 23, 2008	Mount Lemmon	Mount Lemmon Survey	EUN	830 m	MPC · JPL
876616	2008 TR_{108}	—	September 7, 2008	Catalina	CSS	·	930 m	MPC · JPL
876617	2008 TD_{127}	—	October 2, 2008	Catalina	CSS	·	1.8 km	MPC · JPL
876618	2008 TE_{129}	—	September 23, 2008	Kitt Peak	Spacewatch	·	1.9 km	MPC · JPL
876619	2008 TS_{137}	—	October 1, 2008	Mount Lemmon	Mount Lemmon Survey	·	1.9 km	MPC · JPL
876620	2008 TM_{148}	—	September 23, 2008	Mount Lemmon	Mount Lemmon Survey	·	1.5 km	MPC · JPL
876621	2008 TK_{163}	—	October 1, 2008	Kitt Peak	Spacewatch	·	1.0 km	MPC · JPL
876622	2008 TN_{170}	—	October 9, 2008	Kitt Peak	Spacewatch	·	2.1 km	MPC · JPL
876623	2008 TO_{174}	—	September 22, 2008	Kitt Peak	Spacewatch	·	420 m	MPC · JPL
876624	2008 TS_{181}	—	October 1, 2008	Junk Bond	D. Healy	·	720 m	MPC · JPL
876625	2008 TR_{182}	—	October 2, 2008	Kitt Peak	Spacewatch	(5)	750 m	MPC · JPL
876626	2008 TT_{183}	—	October 2, 2008	Kitt Peak	Spacewatch	·	980 m	MPC · JPL
876627	2008 TN_{184}	—	October 6, 2008	Socorro	LINEAR	·	940 m	MPC · JPL
876628	2008 TB_{186}	—	October 7, 2008	Mount Lemmon	Mount Lemmon Survey	·	1.0 km	MPC · JPL
876629	2008 TN_{196}	—	December 17, 2009	Kitt Peak	Spacewatch	3:2 · SHU	3.9 km	MPC · JPL
876630	2008 TV_{196}	—	October 7, 2008	Mount Lemmon	Mount Lemmon Survey	·	830 m	MPC · JPL
876631	2008 TH_{201}	—	October 10, 2008	Mount Lemmon	Mount Lemmon Survey	·	1.5 km	MPC · JPL
876632	2008 TW_{202}	—	August 13, 2012	Haleakala	Pan-STARRS 1	·	960 m	MPC · JPL
876633	2008 TP_{204}	—	October 8, 2008	Mount Lemmon	Mount Lemmon Survey	H	330 m	MPC · JPL
876634	2008 TR_{204}	—	October 8, 2008	Kitt Peak	Spacewatch	·	540 m	MPC · JPL
876635	2008 TZ_{205}	—	October 1, 2008	Mount Lemmon	Mount Lemmon Survey	·	1.7 km	MPC · JPL
876636	2008 TA_{206}	—	October 1, 2008	Kitt Peak	Spacewatch	·	2.1 km	MPC · JPL
876637	2008 TE_{207}	—	October 10, 2008	Mount Lemmon	Mount Lemmon Survey	·	2.1 km	MPC · JPL
876638	2008 TH_{207}	—	October 10, 2008	Mount Lemmon	Mount Lemmon Survey	·	1.7 km	MPC · JPL
876639	2008 TQ_{207}	—	October 1, 2008	Mount Lemmon	Mount Lemmon Survey	·	1.7 km	MPC · JPL
876640	2008 TW_{209}	—	October 8, 2008	Kitt Peak	Spacewatch	PHO	490 m	MPC · JPL
876641	2008 TA_{210}	—	November 21, 2014	Haleakala	Pan-STARRS 1	·	1.9 km	MPC · JPL
876642	2008 TD_{211}	—	September 20, 2008	Kitt Peak	Spacewatch	·	480 m	MPC · JPL
876643	2008 TH_{211}	—	November 16, 2014	Mount Lemmon	Mount Lemmon Survey	·	1.7 km	MPC · JPL
876644	2008 TS_{213}	—	October 8, 2008	Mount Lemmon	Mount Lemmon Survey	·	1.5 km	MPC · JPL
876645	2008 TL_{215}	—	October 8, 2008	Kitt Peak	Spacewatch	·	1.4 km	MPC · JPL
876646	2008 TA_{216}	—	October 2, 2008	Mount Lemmon	Mount Lemmon Survey	AGN	730 m	MPC · JPL
876647	2008 TN_{217}	—	October 2, 2008	Kitt Peak	Spacewatch	·	1.7 km	MPC · JPL
876648	2008 TJ_{220}	—	October 8, 2008	Catalina	CSS	(5)	960 m	MPC · JPL
876649	2008 TJ_{230}	—	October 1, 2008	Catalina	CSS	·	1.0 km	MPC · JPL
876650	2008 TZ_{231}	—	October 1, 2008	Mount Lemmon	Mount Lemmon Survey	KON	1.5 km	MPC · JPL
876651	2008 TQ_{235}	—	October 6, 2008	Mount Lemmon	Mount Lemmon Survey	·	880 m	MPC · JPL
876652	2008 TC_{238}	—	October 7, 2008	Mount Lemmon	Mount Lemmon Survey	GEF	940 m	MPC · JPL
876653	2008 UX	—	October 21, 2008	Mount Lemmon	Mount Lemmon Survey	ATE	240 m	MPC · JPL
876654	2008 UQ_{14}	—	September 25, 2008	Mount Lemmon	Mount Lemmon Survey	·	820 m	MPC · JPL
876655	2008 UL_{23}	—	September 4, 2008	Kitt Peak	Spacewatch	LIX	2.3 km	MPC · JPL
876656	2008 UO_{25}	—	September 24, 2008	Kitt Peak	Spacewatch	3:2 · SHU	3.9 km	MPC · JPL
876657	2008 UF_{28}	—	October 20, 2008	Kitt Peak	Spacewatch	·	530 m	MPC · JPL
876658	2008 UM_{33}	—	October 20, 2008	Mount Lemmon	Mount Lemmon Survey	THM	1.5 km	MPC · JPL
876659	2008 UQ_{36}	—	October 20, 2008	Kitt Peak	Spacewatch	·	2.2 km	MPC · JPL
876660	2008 UV_{40}	—	October 20, 2008	Kitt Peak	Spacewatch	·	1.9 km	MPC · JPL
876661	2008 UN_{45}	—	October 20, 2008	Mount Lemmon	Mount Lemmon Survey	·	1.4 km	MPC · JPL
876662	2008 UZ_{50}	—	September 21, 2008	Kitt Peak	Spacewatch	·	820 m	MPC · JPL
876663	2008 UN_{53}	—	October 3, 2008	Mount Lemmon	Mount Lemmon Survey	(5)	890 m	MPC · JPL
876664	2008 UH_{58}	—	October 7, 2008	Kitt Peak	Spacewatch	·	1.2 km	MPC · JPL
876665	2008 UV_{58}	—	October 7, 2008	Kitt Peak	Spacewatch	EOS	1.4 km	MPC · JPL
876666	2008 UK_{64}	—	October 7, 2008	Mount Lemmon	Mount Lemmon Survey	critical	950 m	MPC · JPL
876667	2008 UV_{66}	—	October 21, 2008	Kitt Peak	Spacewatch	·	1.5 km	MPC · JPL
876668	2008 UC_{68}	—	October 21, 2008	Mount Lemmon	Mount Lemmon Survey	·	1.1 km	MPC · JPL
876669	2008 UW_{72}	—	October 21, 2008	Kitt Peak	Spacewatch	·	950 m	MPC · JPL
876670	2008 UZ_{81}	—	October 22, 2008	Kitt Peak	Spacewatch	·	2.2 km	MPC · JPL
876671	2008 UD_{82}	—	September 25, 2008	Mount Lemmon	Mount Lemmon Survey	·	460 m	MPC · JPL
876672	2008 UN_{87}	—	September 24, 2008	Mount Lemmon	Mount Lemmon Survey	·	1.1 km	MPC · JPL
876673	2008 UV_{101}	—	September 26, 2008	Kitt Peak	Spacewatch	·	1.9 km	MPC · JPL
876674	2008 UA_{102}	—	September 23, 2008	Kitt Peak	Spacewatch	·	1.9 km	MPC · JPL
876675	2008 UN_{102}	—	September 22, 2008	Mount Lemmon	Mount Lemmon Survey	·	920 m	MPC · JPL
876676	2008 UK_{108}	—	October 21, 2008	Kitt Peak	Spacewatch	·	980 m	MPC · JPL
876677	2008 UP_{109}	—	September 29, 2008	Mount Lemmon	Mount Lemmon Survey	·	920 m	MPC · JPL
876678	2008 UM_{110}	—	October 9, 2008	Kitt Peak	Spacewatch	·	710 m	MPC · JPL
876679	2008 UX_{118}	—	October 22, 2008	Kitt Peak	Spacewatch	·	1.9 km	MPC · JPL
876680	2008 UP_{121}	—	October 22, 2008	Kitt Peak	Spacewatch	·	1.6 km	MPC · JPL
876681	2008 UQ_{125}	—	October 22, 2008	Kitt Peak	Spacewatch	·	910 m	MPC · JPL
876682	2008 UL_{128}	—	October 22, 2008	Kitt Peak	Spacewatch	THB	2.3 km	MPC · JPL
876683	2008 UY_{130}	—	October 23, 2008	Kitt Peak	Spacewatch	T_{j} (2.98)	1.7 km	MPC · JPL
876684	2008 UG_{133}	—	October 23, 2008	Kitt Peak	Spacewatch	·	1.8 km	MPC · JPL
876685	2008 UZ_{149}	—	October 6, 2008	Kitt Peak	Spacewatch	·	1.5 km	MPC · JPL
876686	2008 UK_{152}	—	October 23, 2008	Mount Lemmon	Mount Lemmon Survey	critical	1.2 km	MPC · JPL
876687	2008 UJ_{164}	—	October 8, 2008	Mount Lemmon	Mount Lemmon Survey	·	1.4 km	MPC · JPL
876688	2008 UH_{169}	—	September 24, 2008	Mount Lemmon	Mount Lemmon Survey	·	890 m	MPC · JPL
876689	2008 UM_{174}	—	October 24, 2008	Kitt Peak	Spacewatch	·	550 m	MPC · JPL
876690	2008 UN_{180}	—	October 24, 2008	Kitt Peak	Spacewatch	(5)	710 m	MPC · JPL
876691	2008 UF_{181}	—	October 7, 2008	Kitt Peak	Spacewatch	LIX	2.3 km	MPC · JPL
876692	2008 UR_{187}	—	October 24, 2008	Kitt Peak	Spacewatch	·	1.9 km	MPC · JPL
876693	2008 UP_{194}	—	October 26, 2008	Kitt Peak	Spacewatch	·	2.1 km	MPC · JPL
876694	2008 UQ_{194}	—	October 26, 2008	Kitt Peak	Spacewatch	·	1.9 km	MPC · JPL
876695	2008 UG_{197}	—	September 29, 2008	Catalina	CSS	·	1.3 km	MPC · JPL
876696	2008 UE_{199}	—	September 21, 2008	Kitt Peak	Spacewatch	·	1.0 km	MPC · JPL
876697	2008 UE_{200}	—	October 9, 2008	Mount Lemmon	Mount Lemmon Survey	H	430 m	MPC · JPL
876698	2008 UN_{202}	—	October 7, 2008	Kitt Peak	Spacewatch	·	820 m	MPC · JPL
876699	2008 UX_{218}	—	October 25, 2008	Kitt Peak	Spacewatch	·	2.2 km	MPC · JPL
876700	2008 UF_{219}	—	October 25, 2008	Kitt Peak	Spacewatch	·	1.7 km	MPC · JPL

== 876701–876800 ==
back to top

Designation			Discovery			Properties		Ref
Permanent	Provisional	Named after	Date	Site	Discoverer(s)	Category	Diam.	Ref
876701	2008 UN_{220}	—	October 21, 2008	Kitt Peak	Spacewatch	(5)	830 m	MPC · JPL
876702	2008 UD_{221}	—	October 25, 2008	Kitt Peak	Spacewatch	·	880 m	MPC · JPL
876703	2008 UE_{227}	—	October 25, 2008	Kitt Peak	Spacewatch	T_{j} (2.98)	1.6 km	MPC · JPL
876704	2008 UP_{230}	—	September 23, 2008	Kitt Peak	Spacewatch	·	450 m	MPC · JPL
876705	2008 UT_{231}	—	October 26, 2008	Kitt Peak	Spacewatch	(5)	1.0 km	MPC · JPL
876706	2008 UB_{238}	—	October 22, 2008	Kitt Peak	Spacewatch	·	990 m	MPC · JPL
876707	2008 UT_{251}	—	October 27, 2008	Kitt Peak	Spacewatch	·	1.9 km	MPC · JPL
876708	2008 UV_{261}	—	October 27, 2008	Mount Lemmon	Mount Lemmon Survey	H	300 m	MPC · JPL
876709	2008 UZ_{265}	—	October 28, 2008	Kitt Peak	Spacewatch	·	1.9 km	MPC · JPL
876710	2008 UV_{272}	—	October 28, 2008	Mount Lemmon	Mount Lemmon Survey	·	1.9 km	MPC · JPL
876711	2008 UZ_{277}	—	October 20, 2008	Kitt Peak	Spacewatch	THM	1.6 km	MPC · JPL
876712	2008 UT_{287}	—	October 28, 2008	Mount Lemmon	Mount Lemmon Survey	·	2.3 km	MPC · JPL
876713	2008 UZ_{287}	—	September 6, 2008	Mount Lemmon	Mount Lemmon Survey	(5)	960 m	MPC · JPL
876714	2008 UY_{292}	—	October 29, 2008	Kitt Peak	Spacewatch	·	990 m	MPC · JPL
876715	2008 UE_{296}	—	September 23, 2008	Mount Lemmon	Mount Lemmon Survey	·	1.7 km	MPC · JPL
876716	2008 UU_{301}	—	September 29, 2008	Mount Lemmon	Mount Lemmon Survey	·	930 m	MPC · JPL
876717	2008 UE_{306}	—	October 30, 2008	Kitt Peak	Spacewatch	·	2.0 km	MPC · JPL
876718	2008 UY_{307}	—	October 30, 2008	Kitt Peak	Spacewatch	·	900 m	MPC · JPL
876719	2008 UP_{309}	—	September 28, 2008	Mount Lemmon	Mount Lemmon Survey	·	2.3 km	MPC · JPL
876720	2008 UO_{310}	—	October 25, 2008	Catalina	CSS	·	970 m	MPC · JPL
876721	2008 US_{311}	—	October 22, 2008	Kitt Peak	Spacewatch	TIR	2.0 km	MPC · JPL
876722	2008 UP_{314}	—	September 25, 2008	Mount Lemmon	Mount Lemmon Survey	(5)	940 m	MPC · JPL
876723	2008 UF_{317}	—	October 31, 2008	Kitt Peak	Spacewatch	·	1.1 km	MPC · JPL
876724	2008 UN_{317}	—	October 1, 2008	Mount Lemmon	Mount Lemmon Survey	THM	1.5 km	MPC · JPL
876725	2008 UO_{318}	—	October 31, 2008	Mount Lemmon	Mount Lemmon Survey	·	2.4 km	MPC · JPL
876726	2008 UB_{321}	—	October 8, 2008	Mount Lemmon	Mount Lemmon Survey	·	730 m	MPC · JPL
876727	2008 UK_{321}	—	October 8, 2008	Mount Lemmon	Mount Lemmon Survey	3:2	3.6 km	MPC · JPL
876728	2008 UG_{322}	—	September 28, 2008	Mount Lemmon	Mount Lemmon Survey	·	2.0 km	MPC · JPL
876729	2008 UN_{325}	—	October 31, 2008	Mount Lemmon	Mount Lemmon Survey	EOS	1.4 km	MPC · JPL
876730	2008 US_{329}	—	September 25, 2008	Kitt Peak	Spacewatch	(5)	1.1 km	MPC · JPL
876731	2008 UY_{329}	—	October 1, 2008	Mount Lemmon	Mount Lemmon Survey	THM	1.7 km	MPC · JPL
876732	2008 UJ_{339}	—	October 23, 2008	Kitt Peak	Spacewatch	·	1.9 km	MPC · JPL
876733	2008 UC_{343}	—	October 21, 2008	Mount Lemmon	Mount Lemmon Survey	EUP	2.8 km	MPC · JPL
876734	2008 UA_{345}	—	October 31, 2008	Kitt Peak	Spacewatch	·	2.2 km	MPC · JPL
876735	2008 UG_{356}	—	October 22, 2008	Kitt Peak	Spacewatch	H	370 m	MPC · JPL
876736	2008 UW_{365}	—	October 26, 2008	Mount Lemmon	Mount Lemmon Survey	·	1.5 km	MPC · JPL
876737	2008 UE_{366}	—	October 20, 2008	Kitt Peak	Spacewatch	3:2 · SHU	3.2 km	MPC · JPL
876738	2008 UA_{368}	—	October 30, 2008	Socorro	LINEAR	·	1.1 km	MPC · JPL
876739	2008 UL_{370}	—	October 31, 2008	Socorro	LINEAR	·	1.4 km	MPC · JPL
876740	2008 UB_{375}	—	October 26, 2008	Kitt Peak	Spacewatch	·	1.3 km	MPC · JPL
876741	2008 UN_{377}	—	October 28, 2008	Mount Lemmon	Mount Lemmon Survey	(5)	1.1 km	MPC · JPL
876742	2008 UO_{381}	—	March 24, 2014	Haleakala	Pan-STARRS 1	·	820 m	MPC · JPL
876743	2008 UT_{386}	—	October 26, 2008	Mount Lemmon	Mount Lemmon Survey	critical	1.4 km	MPC · JPL
876744	2008 US_{389}	—	October 21, 2008	Mount Lemmon	Mount Lemmon Survey	·	2.1 km	MPC · JPL
876745	2008 UD_{390}	—	October 25, 2008	Kitt Peak	Spacewatch	·	2.1 km	MPC · JPL
876746	2008 UW_{390}	—	September 15, 2002	Kitt Peak	Spacewatch	THM	1.5 km	MPC · JPL
876747	2008 UX_{390}	—	October 24, 2008	Kitt Peak	Spacewatch	LIX	2.7 km	MPC · JPL
876748	2008 UN_{391}	—	October 18, 2008	Cerro Las Campanas	EURONEAR	·	1.7 km	MPC · JPL
876749	2008 UP_{391}	—	July 15, 2013	Haleakala	Pan-STARRS 1	·	1.8 km	MPC · JPL
876750	2008 UV_{391}	—	October 21, 2008	Kitt Peak	Spacewatch	HYG	2.0 km	MPC · JPL
876751	2008 UY_{392}	—	August 14, 2013	Haleakala	Pan-STARRS 1	·	1.8 km	MPC · JPL
876752	2008 UO_{393}	—	October 29, 2008	Kitt Peak	Spacewatch	·	2.0 km	MPC · JPL
876753	2008 UY_{394}	—	August 9, 2013	Kitt Peak	Spacewatch	·	1.6 km	MPC · JPL
876754	2008 UB_{398}	—	October 28, 2008	Mount Lemmon	Mount Lemmon Survey	·	2.4 km	MPC · JPL
876755	2008 UG_{401}	—	October 25, 2008	Mount Lemmon	Mount Lemmon Survey	LIX	2.2 km	MPC · JPL
876756	2008 UP_{402}	—	October 18, 2008	Kitt Peak	Spacewatch	EUP	2.3 km	MPC · JPL
876757	2008 UC_{403}	—	October 23, 2008	Kitt Peak	Spacewatch	·	1.6 km	MPC · JPL
876758	2008 UD_{405}	—	October 25, 2008	Mount Lemmon	Mount Lemmon Survey	EOS	1.4 km	MPC · JPL
876759	2008 UU_{405}	—	October 26, 2008	Mount Lemmon	Mount Lemmon Survey	·	2.1 km	MPC · JPL
876760	2008 UW_{405}	—	October 22, 2008	Kitt Peak	Spacewatch	EOS	1.3 km	MPC · JPL
876761	2008 UY_{405}	—	October 29, 2008	Kitt Peak	Spacewatch	·	2.3 km	MPC · JPL
876762	2008 UM_{408}	—	October 26, 2008	Mount Lemmon	Mount Lemmon Survey	·	1.6 km	MPC · JPL
876763	2008 UP_{408}	—	October 27, 2008	Kitt Peak	Spacewatch	·	1.2 km	MPC · JPL
876764	2008 UR_{409}	—	October 26, 2008	Mount Lemmon	Mount Lemmon Survey	·	1.8 km	MPC · JPL
876765	2008 UD_{410}	—	October 21, 2008	Kitt Peak	Spacewatch	·	2.2 km	MPC · JPL
876766	2008 UQ_{410}	—	October 30, 2008	Kitt Peak	Spacewatch	·	810 m	MPC · JPL
876767	2008 UH_{416}	—	October 9, 2008	Mount Lemmon	Mount Lemmon Survey	EOS	1.4 km	MPC · JPL
876768	2008 UH_{418}	—	October 26, 2008	Mount Lemmon	Mount Lemmon Survey	ADE	1.3 km	MPC · JPL
876769	2008 UQ_{429}	—	October 31, 2008	Mount Lemmon	Mount Lemmon Survey	·	1.8 km	MPC · JPL
876770	2008 VB_{5}	—	October 21, 2008	Kitt Peak	Spacewatch	·	1.0 km	MPC · JPL
876771	2008 VX_{26}	—	October 22, 2008	Kitt Peak	Spacewatch	·	1.0 km	MPC · JPL
876772	2008 VE_{27}	—	November 2, 2008	Kitt Peak	Spacewatch	·	2.2 km	MPC · JPL
876773	2008 VM_{31}	—	November 2, 2008	Mount Lemmon	Mount Lemmon Survey	EUN · critical	680 m	MPC · JPL
876774	2008 VA_{44}	—	September 22, 2008	Mount Lemmon	Mount Lemmon Survey	·	880 m	MPC · JPL
876775	2008 VG_{46}	—	October 24, 2008	Catalina	CSS	·	920 m	MPC · JPL
876776	2008 VQ_{55}	—	October 29, 2008	Kitt Peak	Spacewatch	H	320 m	MPC · JPL
876777	2008 VO_{57}	—	November 6, 2008	Mount Lemmon	Mount Lemmon Survey	(5)	870 m	MPC · JPL
876778	2008 VC_{61}	—	November 8, 2008	Mount Lemmon	Mount Lemmon Survey	THM	1.7 km	MPC · JPL
876779	2008 VH_{62}	—	October 31, 2008	Kitt Peak	Spacewatch	·	1.8 km	MPC · JPL
876780	2008 VU_{66}	—	November 3, 2008	Kitt Peak	Spacewatch	THM	1.5 km	MPC · JPL
876781	2008 VM_{82}	—	November 6, 2008	Kitt Peak	Spacewatch	·	2.1 km	MPC · JPL
876782	2008 VW_{87}	—	November 8, 2008	Mount Lemmon	Mount Lemmon Survey	EUN	1.1 km	MPC · JPL
876783	2008 VQ_{89}	—	September 3, 2013	Haleakala	Pan-STARRS 1	LIX	2.1 km	MPC · JPL
876784	2008 VR_{90}	—	October 26, 2014	Mount Lemmon	Mount Lemmon Survey	·	2.3 km	MPC · JPL
876785	2008 VF_{92}	—	December 23, 2014	Mount Lemmon	Mount Lemmon Survey	·	2.2 km	MPC · JPL
876786	2008 VN_{92}	—	November 27, 2014	Haleakala	Pan-STARRS 1	·	2.7 km	MPC · JPL
876787	2008 VN_{93}	—	November 6, 2008	Mount Lemmon	Mount Lemmon Survey	·	2.1 km	MPC · JPL
876788	2008 VP_{93}	—	November 6, 2008	Mount Lemmon	Mount Lemmon Survey	·	2.6 km	MPC · JPL
876789	2008 VW_{96}	—	November 1, 2008	Mount Lemmon	Mount Lemmon Survey	VER	1.8 km	MPC · JPL
876790	2008 VJ_{98}	—	November 2, 2008	Mount Lemmon	Mount Lemmon Survey	·	780 m	MPC · JPL
876791	2008 VN_{100}	—	November 7, 2008	Mount Lemmon	Mount Lemmon Survey	·	2.2 km	MPC · JPL
876792	2008 VV_{106}	—	November 1, 2008	Mount Lemmon	Mount Lemmon Survey	JUN	630 m	MPC · JPL
876793	2008 VK_{107}	—	November 9, 2008	Mount Lemmon	Mount Lemmon Survey	·	920 m	MPC · JPL
876794	2008 VO_{109}	—	November 2, 2008	Kitt Peak	Spacewatch	·	2.3 km	MPC · JPL
876795	2008 WL_{8}	—	November 17, 2008	Kitt Peak	Spacewatch	THM	1.4 km	MPC · JPL
876796	2008 WH_{18}	—	September 29, 2008	Kitt Peak	Spacewatch	HNS	820 m	MPC · JPL
876797	2008 WF_{21}	—	September 9, 2008	Mount Lemmon	Mount Lemmon Survey	THM	1.7 km	MPC · JPL
876798	2008 WP_{21}	—	November 17, 2008	Kitt Peak	Spacewatch	·	1.4 km	MPC · JPL
876799	2008 WC_{26}	—	October 31, 2008	Mount Lemmon	Mount Lemmon Survey	·	1.0 km	MPC · JPL
876800	2008 WS_{26}	—	September 6, 2008	Kitt Peak	Spacewatch	NYS	760 m	MPC · JPL

== 876801–876900 ==
back to top

Designation			Discovery			Properties		Ref
Permanent	Provisional	Named after	Date	Site	Discoverer(s)	Category	Diam.	Ref
876801	2008 WO_{30}	—	November 19, 2008	Mount Lemmon	Mount Lemmon Survey	LIX	2.7 km	MPC · JPL
876802	2008 WJ_{31}	—	November 19, 2008	Mount Lemmon	Mount Lemmon Survey	·	1.8 km	MPC · JPL
876803	2008 WR_{39}	—	November 17, 2008	Kitt Peak	Spacewatch	THM	1.3 km	MPC · JPL
876804	2008 WJ_{40}	—	November 17, 2008	Kitt Peak	Spacewatch	THM	1.3 km	MPC · JPL
876805	2008 WD_{52}	—	October 25, 2008	Mount Lemmon	Mount Lemmon Survey	·	1.8 km	MPC · JPL
876806	2008 WF_{52}	—	November 7, 2008	Kitt Peak	Spacewatch	(5)	720 m	MPC · JPL
876807	2008 WU_{53}	—	November 8, 2008	Mount Lemmon	Mount Lemmon Survey	·	2.1 km	MPC · JPL
876808	2008 WH_{56}	—	October 23, 2008	Kitt Peak	Spacewatch	·	890 m	MPC · JPL
876809	2008 WJ_{65}	—	October 25, 2008	Mount Lemmon	Mount Lemmon Survey	·	2.0 km	MPC · JPL
876810	2008 WX_{68}	—	November 18, 2008	Kitt Peak	Spacewatch	·	2.1 km	MPC · JPL
876811	2008 WE_{76}	—	November 20, 2008	Kitt Peak	Spacewatch	·	2.0 km	MPC · JPL
876812	2008 WF_{78}	—	October 26, 2008	Kitt Peak	Spacewatch	·	2.5 km	MPC · JPL
876813	2008 WZ_{94}	—	November 30, 2008	Kitt Peak	Spacewatch	APO · PHA	320 m	MPC · JPL
876814	2008 WF_{99}	—	November 24, 2008	Kitt Peak	Spacewatch	·	1.4 km	MPC · JPL
876815	2008 WY_{108}	—	October 29, 2008	Kitt Peak	Spacewatch	·	870 m	MPC · JPL
876816	2008 WQ_{113}	—	November 6, 2008	Mount Lemmon	Mount Lemmon Survey	·	2.0 km	MPC · JPL
876817	2008 WW_{114}	—	November 30, 2008	Kitt Peak	Spacewatch	·	1.9 km	MPC · JPL
876818	2008 WQ_{119}	—	November 19, 2008	Kitt Peak	Spacewatch	·	1.6 km	MPC · JPL
876819	2008 WA_{122}	—	November 19, 2008	Mount Lemmon	Mount Lemmon Survey	·	1.9 km	MPC · JPL
876820	2008 WB_{122}	—	November 19, 2008	Mount Lemmon	Mount Lemmon Survey	·	1.9 km	MPC · JPL
876821	2008 WT_{122}	—	November 30, 2008	Mount Lemmon	Mount Lemmon Survey	·	2.4 km	MPC · JPL
876822	2008 WC_{125}	—	November 24, 2008	Kitt Peak	Spacewatch	EUP	2.4 km	MPC · JPL
876823	2008 WL_{128}	—	October 31, 2008	Kitt Peak	Spacewatch	·	1.9 km	MPC · JPL
876824	2008 WS_{145}	—	November 30, 2008	Mount Lemmon	Mount Lemmon Survey	·	980 m	MPC · JPL
876825	2008 WT_{145}	—	November 30, 2008	Kitt Peak	Spacewatch	JUN	710 m	MPC · JPL
876826	2008 WE_{150}	—	September 24, 2008	Mount Lemmon	Mount Lemmon Survey	·	2.0 km	MPC · JPL
876827	2008 WE_{151}	—	November 19, 2008	Kitt Peak	Spacewatch	·	2.3 km	MPC · JPL
876828	2008 WK_{154}	—	January 17, 2015	Mount Lemmon	Mount Lemmon Survey	·	1.6 km	MPC · JPL
876829	2008 WQ_{154}	—	March 13, 2016	Haleakala	Pan-STARRS 1	·	2.0 km	MPC · JPL
876830	2008 WP_{155}	—	November 18, 2008	Kitt Peak	Spacewatch	·	2.1 km	MPC · JPL
876831	2008 WF_{157}	—	November 20, 2008	Kitt Peak	Spacewatch	HYG	2.1 km	MPC · JPL
876832	2008 WW_{157}	—	November 21, 2008	Kitt Peak	Spacewatch	·	1.9 km	MPC · JPL
876833	2008 WE_{159}	—	November 21, 2008	Kitt Peak	Spacewatch	EUN	780 m	MPC · JPL
876834	2008 WZ_{159}	—	November 30, 2008	Kitt Peak	Spacewatch	·	2.4 km	MPC · JPL
876835	2008 WE_{160}	—	November 21, 2008	Mount Lemmon	Mount Lemmon Survey	EUN	880 m	MPC · JPL
876836	2008 WC_{161}	—	November 19, 2008	Mount Lemmon	Mount Lemmon Survey	critical	990 m	MPC · JPL
876837	2008 WU_{161}	—	November 21, 2008	Mount Lemmon	Mount Lemmon Survey	·	2.0 km	MPC · JPL
876838	2008 WS_{164}	—	November 24, 2008	Mount Lemmon	Mount Lemmon Survey	·	900 m	MPC · JPL
876839	2008 WC_{167}	—	November 30, 2008	Mount Lemmon	Mount Lemmon Survey	H	470 m	MPC · JPL
876840	2008 WY_{168}	—	November 21, 2008	Mount Lemmon	Mount Lemmon Survey	·	1.8 km	MPC · JPL
876841	2008 XB_{1}	—	December 3, 2008	Catalina	CSS	APO · PHA	220 m	MPC · JPL
876842	2008 XK_{7}	—	October 28, 2008	Kitt Peak	Spacewatch	·	1.9 km	MPC · JPL
876843	2008 XM_{23}	—	October 25, 2008	Kitt Peak	Spacewatch	LIX	2.0 km	MPC · JPL
876844	2008 XX_{25}	—	October 28, 2008	Kitt Peak	Spacewatch	·	1.4 km	MPC · JPL
876845	2008 XJ_{26}	—	October 31, 2008	Kitt Peak	Spacewatch	·	820 m	MPC · JPL
876846	2008 XR_{46}	—	October 24, 2008	Kitt Peak	Spacewatch	·	1.9 km	MPC · JPL
876847	2008 XY_{47}	—	December 4, 2008	Mount Lemmon	Mount Lemmon Survey	(194)	910 m	MPC · JPL
876848	2008 XW_{48}	—	December 4, 2008	Mount Lemmon	Mount Lemmon Survey	T_{j} (2.94)	2.7 km	MPC · JPL
876849	2008 XJ_{63}	—	January 20, 2015	Haleakala	Pan-STARRS 1	·	2.0 km	MPC · JPL
876850	2008 XB_{65}	—	March 4, 2016	Haleakala	Pan-STARRS 1	·	2.2 km	MPC · JPL
876851	2008 XL_{66}	—	December 1, 2008	Kitt Peak	Spacewatch	·	2.5 km	MPC · JPL
876852	2008 XA_{67}	—	December 2, 2008	Mount Lemmon	Mount Lemmon Survey	(895)	2.7 km	MPC · JPL
876853	2008 XO_{68}	—	December 5, 2008	Kitt Peak	Spacewatch	·	1.0 km	MPC · JPL
876854	2008 XD_{69}	—	December 5, 2008	Mount Lemmon	Mount Lemmon Survey	·	1.1 km	MPC · JPL
876855	2008 YD_{2}	—	December 20, 2008	Socorro	LINEAR	·	1.3 km	MPC · JPL
876856	2008 YY_{25}	—	November 20, 2008	Kitt Peak	Spacewatch	LIX	2.3 km	MPC · JPL
876857	2008 YG_{28}	—	December 2, 2008	Catalina	CSS	·	1.2 km	MPC · JPL
876858	2008 YR_{37}	—	November 24, 2008	Mount Lemmon	Mount Lemmon Survey	EUN	850 m	MPC · JPL
876859	2008 YJ_{43}	—	December 6, 2008	Kitt Peak	Spacewatch	·	2.7 km	MPC · JPL
876860	2008 YG_{45}	—	December 29, 2008	Mount Lemmon	Mount Lemmon Survey	·	2.3 km	MPC · JPL
876861	2008 YE_{48}	—	December 29, 2008	Mount Lemmon	Mount Lemmon Survey	·	1.6 km	MPC · JPL
876862	2008 YW_{48}	—	December 22, 2008	Kitt Peak	Spacewatch	THM	1.7 km	MPC · JPL
876863	2008 YV_{56}	—	December 22, 2008	Kitt Peak	Spacewatch	·	790 m	MPC · JPL
876864	2008 YJ_{57}	—	December 22, 2008	Kitt Peak	Spacewatch	EUN	780 m	MPC · JPL
876865	2008 YZ_{66}	—	December 5, 2008	Kitt Peak	Spacewatch	·	2.0 km	MPC · JPL
876866	2008 YS_{89}	—	December 29, 2008	Kitt Peak	Spacewatch	·	1.1 km	MPC · JPL
876867	2008 YP_{92}	—	December 29, 2008	Kitt Peak	Spacewatch	NYS	480 m	MPC · JPL
876868	2008 YR_{96}	—	December 21, 2008	Mount Lemmon	Mount Lemmon Survey	·	1.0 km	MPC · JPL
876869	2008 YN_{100}	—	December 21, 2008	Mount Lemmon	Mount Lemmon Survey	·	2.5 km	MPC · JPL
876870	2008 YG_{101}	—	December 29, 2008	Kitt Peak	Spacewatch	·	1.2 km	MPC · JPL
876871	2008 YO_{116}	—	December 21, 2008	Mount Lemmon	Mount Lemmon Survey	·	1.0 km	MPC · JPL
876872	2008 YF_{128}	—	December 30, 2008	Kitt Peak	Spacewatch	·	1.2 km	MPC · JPL
876873	2008 YC_{132}	—	December 31, 2008	Kitt Peak	Spacewatch	·	1.8 km	MPC · JPL
876874	2008 YQ_{175}	—	December 31, 2008	Kitt Peak	Spacewatch	·	890 m	MPC · JPL
876875	2008 YV_{178}	—	December 30, 2008	Kitt Peak	Spacewatch	·	1.1 km	MPC · JPL
876876	2008 YP_{180}	—	December 4, 2008	Mount Lemmon	Mount Lemmon Survey	·	560 m	MPC · JPL
876877	2008 YW_{180}	—	December 31, 2008	Kitt Peak	Spacewatch	EUP	2.5 km	MPC · JPL
876878	2008 YC_{181}	—	December 30, 2008	Kitt Peak	Spacewatch	·	1.2 km	MPC · JPL
876879	2008 YP_{181}	—	December 22, 2008	Mount Lemmon	Mount Lemmon Survey	·	1.0 km	MPC · JPL
876880	2008 YT_{186}	—	December 31, 2008	Kitt Peak	Spacewatch	·	1.0 km	MPC · JPL
876881	2008 YN_{188}	—	December 22, 2008	Kitt Peak	Spacewatch	·	2.3 km	MPC · JPL
876882	2008 YQ_{189}	—	December 31, 2008	Kitt Peak	Spacewatch	·	2.1 km	MPC · JPL
876883	2008 YE_{190}	—	December 29, 2008	Mount Lemmon	Mount Lemmon Survey	·	860 m	MPC · JPL
876884	2008 YL_{198}	—	December 22, 2008	Kitt Peak	Spacewatch	·	1.9 km	MPC · JPL
876885	2009 AS_{9}	—	December 22, 2008	Kitt Peak	Spacewatch	·	2.0 km	MPC · JPL
876886	2009 AS_{15}	—	January 15, 2009	Calar Alto	F. Hormuth	·	1.0 km	MPC · JPL
876887	2009 AM_{19}	—	December 22, 2008	Kitt Peak	Spacewatch	·	2.0 km	MPC · JPL
876888	2009 AN_{20}	—	December 22, 2008	Kitt Peak	Spacewatch	·	2.3 km	MPC · JPL
876889	2009 AD_{23}	—	December 30, 2008	Kitt Peak	Spacewatch	·	1.3 km	MPC · JPL
876890	2009 AK_{42}	—	January 1, 2009	Mount Lemmon	Mount Lemmon Survey	H	410 m	MPC · JPL
876891	2009 AE_{45}	—	January 15, 2009	Kitt Peak	Spacewatch	·	920 m	MPC · JPL
876892	2009 AH_{54}	—	July 26, 2011	Haleakala	Pan-STARRS 1	·	630 m	MPC · JPL
876893	2009 AT_{54}	—	January 1, 2009	Mount Lemmon	Mount Lemmon Survey	BAR	1.2 km	MPC · JPL
876894	2009 AN_{56}	—	December 20, 2014	Haleakala	Pan-STARRS 1	·	1.9 km	MPC · JPL
876895	2009 AT_{56}	—	January 3, 2009	Mount Lemmon	Mount Lemmon Survey	·	1.1 km	MPC · JPL
876896	2009 AY_{56}	—	January 2, 2009	Mount Lemmon	Mount Lemmon Survey	·	990 m	MPC · JPL
876897	2009 AN_{58}	—	September 26, 2013	Mount Lemmon	Mount Lemmon Survey	·	2.1 km	MPC · JPL
876898	2009 AQ_{60}	—	January 1, 2009	Kitt Peak	Spacewatch	ADE	1.2 km	MPC · JPL
876899	2009 AC_{61}	—	January 3, 2009	Mount Lemmon	Mount Lemmon Survey	HNS	760 m	MPC · JPL
876900	2009 AR_{63}	—	January 1, 2009	Kitt Peak	Spacewatch	·	840 m	MPC · JPL

== 876901–877000 ==
back to top

Designation			Discovery			Properties		Ref
Permanent	Provisional	Named after	Date	Site	Discoverer(s)	Category	Diam.	Ref
876901	2009 AP_{66}	—	January 2, 2009	Mount Lemmon	Mount Lemmon Survey	·	2.0 km	MPC · JPL
876902	2009 BG_{17}	—	December 22, 2008	Mount Lemmon	Mount Lemmon Survey	·	1.0 km	MPC · JPL
876903	2009 BO_{24}	—	January 17, 2009	Catalina	CSS	·	1.2 km	MPC · JPL
876904	2009 BH_{28}	—	December 29, 2008	Kitt Peak	Spacewatch	·	980 m	MPC · JPL
876905	2009 BU_{28}	—	December 22, 2008	Kitt Peak	Spacewatch	·	2.3 km	MPC · JPL
876906	2009 BU_{41}	—	January 16, 2009	Kitt Peak	Spacewatch	·	500 m	MPC · JPL
876907	2009 BP_{45}	—	January 16, 2009	Kitt Peak	Spacewatch	·	1.0 km	MPC · JPL
876908	2009 BC_{49}	—	December 22, 2008	Kitt Peak	Spacewatch	·	2.1 km	MPC · JPL
876909	2009 BD_{53}	—	December 22, 2008	Mount Lemmon	Mount Lemmon Survey	·	1.4 km	MPC · JPL
876910	2009 BC_{56}	—	January 3, 2009	Kitt Peak	Spacewatch	·	1.1 km	MPC · JPL
876911	2009 BD_{56}	—	January 1, 2009	Kitt Peak	Spacewatch	·	1.1 km	MPC · JPL
876912	2009 BE_{58}	—	January 27, 2009	Socorro	LINEAR	ATE · PHA	160 m	MPC · JPL
876913	2009 BE_{65}	—	January 20, 2009	Kitt Peak	Spacewatch	·	1.9 km	MPC · JPL
876914	2009 BN_{70}	—	January 17, 2009	Catalina	CSS	·	1.4 km	MPC · JPL
876915	2009 BB_{95}	—	December 1, 2008	Mount Lemmon	Mount Lemmon Survey	·	1.2 km	MPC · JPL
876916	2009 BH_{101}	—	January 28, 2009	Kitt Peak	Spacewatch	THM	1.8 km	MPC · JPL
876917	2009 BM_{108}	—	January 29, 2009	Mount Lemmon	Mount Lemmon Survey	·	1.3 km	MPC · JPL
876918	2009 BR_{120}	—	January 31, 2009	Kitt Peak	Spacewatch	ADE	1.4 km	MPC · JPL
876919	2009 BT_{127}	—	January 29, 2009	Kitt Peak	Spacewatch	·	580 m	MPC · JPL
876920	2009 BN_{128}	—	January 18, 2009	Kitt Peak	Spacewatch	·	1.1 km	MPC · JPL
876921	2009 BO_{129}	—	December 30, 2008	Mount Lemmon	Mount Lemmon Survey	(1547)	1.0 km	MPC · JPL
876922	2009 BF_{132}	—	January 30, 2009	Mount Lemmon	Mount Lemmon Survey	·	1.8 km	MPC · JPL
876923	2009 BL_{138}	—	January 29, 2009	Kitt Peak	Spacewatch	MIS	1.9 km	MPC · JPL
876924	2009 BA_{139}	—	January 15, 2009	Kitt Peak	Spacewatch	·	1.2 km	MPC · JPL
876925	2009 BK_{154}	—	January 31, 2009	Kitt Peak	Spacewatch	T_{j} (2.98)	2.3 km	MPC · JPL
876926	2009 BR_{154}	—	January 20, 2009	Kitt Peak	Spacewatch	·	990 m	MPC · JPL
876927	2009 BO_{173}	—	January 20, 2009	Kitt Peak	Spacewatch	·	2.1 km	MPC · JPL
876928	2009 BQ_{180}	—	January 30, 2009	Kitt Peak	Spacewatch	MIS	1.8 km	MPC · JPL
876929	2009 BR_{197}	—	January 26, 2009	Mount Lemmon	Mount Lemmon Survey	(1547)	1.0 km	MPC · JPL
876930	2009 BO_{204}	—	August 12, 2018	Haleakala	Pan-STARRS 1	·	2.3 km	MPC · JPL
876931	2009 BP_{207}	—	January 30, 2009	Mount Lemmon	Mount Lemmon Survey	LIX	2.8 km	MPC · JPL
876932	2009 BY_{207}	—	January 20, 2009	Kitt Peak	Spacewatch	·	1.4 km	MPC · JPL
876933	2009 BA_{215}	—	January 31, 2009	Mount Lemmon	Mount Lemmon Survey	·	920 m	MPC · JPL
876934	2009 BN_{215}	—	January 20, 2009	Mount Lemmon	Mount Lemmon Survey	JUN	760 m	MPC · JPL
876935	2009 CE_{17}	—	October 4, 2004	Kitt Peak	Spacewatch	·	460 m	MPC · JPL
876936	2009 CX_{20}	—	February 1, 2009	Kitt Peak	Spacewatch	·	2.1 km	MPC · JPL
876937	2009 CF_{50}	—	February 14, 2009	Mount Lemmon	Mount Lemmon Survey	·	1.2 km	MPC · JPL
876938	2009 CO_{61}	—	February 1, 2009	Kitt Peak	Spacewatch	AEO	760 m	MPC · JPL
876939	2009 DA_{7}	—	December 5, 2008	Catalina	CSS	T_{j} (2.93)	2.7 km	MPC · JPL
876940	2009 DT_{13}	—	January 3, 2009	Mount Lemmon	Mount Lemmon Survey	·	1.3 km	MPC · JPL
876941	2009 DJ_{50}	—	February 19, 2009	Kitt Peak	Spacewatch	PHO	490 m	MPC · JPL
876942	2009 DB_{61}	—	February 22, 2009	Kitt Peak	Spacewatch	·	630 m	MPC · JPL
876943	2009 DK_{64}	—	February 22, 2009	Kitt Peak	Spacewatch	·	1.2 km	MPC · JPL
876944	2009 DV_{99}	—	January 25, 2009	Kitt Peak	Spacewatch	ERI	930 m	MPC · JPL
876945	2009 DJ_{118}	—	February 27, 2009	Kitt Peak	Spacewatch	·	1.1 km	MPC · JPL
876946	2009 DN_{128}	—	February 22, 2009	Kitt Peak	Spacewatch	·	720 m	MPC · JPL
876947	2009 DW_{150}	—	March 29, 2014	Mount Lemmon	Mount Lemmon Survey	·	1.4 km	MPC · JPL
876948	2009 DL_{151}	—	September 11, 2015	Haleakala	Pan-STARRS 1	·	1.1 km	MPC · JPL
876949	2009 DA_{153}	—	February 1, 2009	Mount Lemmon	Mount Lemmon Survey	JUN	820 m	MPC · JPL
876950	2009 DE_{161}	—	February 22, 2009	Mount Lemmon	Mount Lemmon Survey	·	1.3 km	MPC · JPL
876951	2009 DG_{164}	—	March 3, 2009	Mauna Kea	P. A. Wiegert	MAR	770 m	MPC · JPL
876952	2009 EL_{34}	—	March 15, 2009	Kitt Peak	Spacewatch	·	620 m	MPC · JPL
876953	2009 EA_{41}	—	March 2, 2009	Mount Lemmon	Mount Lemmon Survey	·	960 m	MPC · JPL
876954	2009 FF	—	March 16, 2009	Mount Lemmon	Mount Lemmon Survey	APO · PHA	140 m	MPC · JPL
876955	2009 FK_{13}	—	March 3, 2009	Mount Lemmon	Mount Lemmon Survey	·	1.1 km	MPC · JPL
876956	2009 FQ_{79}	—	March 2, 2009	Kitt Peak	Spacewatch	·	1 km	MPC · JPL
876957	2009 FO_{84}	—	March 25, 2014	Kitt Peak	Spacewatch	·	1.6 km	MPC · JPL
876958	2009 FH_{85}	—	March 31, 2009	Mount Lemmon	Mount Lemmon Survey	·	1.4 km	MPC · JPL
876959	2009 FQ_{85}	—	March 19, 2009	Mount Lemmon	Mount Lemmon Survey	·	1.3 km	MPC · JPL
876960	2009 FW_{86}	—	October 23, 2011	Mount Lemmon	Mount Lemmon Survey	·	1.4 km	MPC · JPL
876961	2009 FB_{87}	—	March 22, 2009	Catalina	CSS	H	320 m	MPC · JPL
876962	2009 FG_{87}	—	March 28, 2009	Kitt Peak	Spacewatch	AEO	880 m	MPC · JPL
876963	2009 FR_{87}	—	March 19, 2009	Kitt Peak	Spacewatch	·	1.1 km	MPC · JPL
876964	2009 FO_{93}	—	March 21, 2009	Mount Lemmon	Mount Lemmon Survey	ADE	1.5 km	MPC · JPL
876965	2009 GB_{8}	—	March 3, 2016	Haleakala	Pan-STARRS 1	·	530 m	MPC · JPL
876966	2009 GW_{8}	—	April 2, 2009	Kitt Peak	Spacewatch	H	440 m	MPC · JPL
876967	2009 GN_{10}	—	April 2, 2009	Kitt Peak	Spacewatch	·	1.1 km	MPC · JPL
876968	2009 GT_{10}	—	April 2, 2009	Mount Lemmon	Mount Lemmon Survey	·	1.6 km	MPC · JPL
876969	2009 HJ_{7}	—	April 2, 2009	Kitt Peak	Spacewatch	·	830 m	MPC · JPL
876970	2009 HV_{8}	—	April 17, 2009	Mount Lemmon	Mount Lemmon Survey	·	2.5 km	MPC · JPL
876971	2009 HD_{46}	—	April 17, 2009	Catalina	CSS	·	1.2 km	MPC · JPL
876972	2009 HE_{54}	—	February 19, 2009	Kitt Peak	Spacewatch	·	1.2 km	MPC · JPL
876973	2009 HK_{55}	—	March 21, 2009	Kitt Peak	Spacewatch	·	1.4 km	MPC · JPL
876974	2009 HF_{75}	—	March 31, 2009	Mount Lemmon	Mount Lemmon Survey	·	1.0 km	MPC · JPL
876975	2009 HQ_{87}	—	April 21, 2009	Mount Lemmon	Mount Lemmon Survey	·	1.3 km	MPC · JPL
876976	2009 HH_{113}	—	April 30, 2009	Mount Lemmon	Mount Lemmon Survey	·	810 m	MPC · JPL
876977	2009 HW_{124}	—	April 19, 2009	Mount Lemmon	Mount Lemmon Survey	·	1.2 km	MPC · JPL
876978	2009 HZ_{127}	—	April 24, 2009	Mount Lemmon	Mount Lemmon Survey	PHO	730 m	MPC · JPL
876979	2009 HD_{128}	—	April 18, 2009	Kitt Peak	Spacewatch	·	1.1 km	MPC · JPL
876980	2009 JC_{1}	—	May 4, 2009	La Sagra	OAM	·	1.3 km	MPC · JPL
876981	2009 KP_{19}	—	April 19, 2009	Kitt Peak	Spacewatch	·	1.2 km	MPC · JPL
876982	2009 MX_{6}	—	June 24, 2009	Siding Spring	SSS	APO	510 m	MPC · JPL
876983	2009 NH_{1}	—	July 15, 2009	La Sagra	OAM	·	480 m	MPC · JPL
876984	2009 OC_{29}	—	July 29, 2009	Kitt Peak	Spacewatch	·	1.8 km	MPC · JPL
876985	2009 OG_{29}	—	July 29, 2009	Kitt Peak	Spacewatch	·	1.3 km	MPC · JPL
876986	2009 PZ_{6}	—	August 15, 2009	Kitt Peak	Spacewatch	·	1.1 km	MPC · JPL
876987	2009 PC_{14}	—	August 15, 2009	Kitt Peak	Spacewatch	·	1.4 km	MPC · JPL
876988	2009 PU_{22}	—	September 12, 2014	Haleakala	Pan-STARRS 1	·	1.6 km	MPC · JPL
876989	2009 QG_{10}	—	August 15, 2009	Catalina	CSS	T_{j} (2.95)	1.7 km	MPC · JPL
876990	2009 QD_{26}	—	June 23, 2009	Mount Lemmon	Mount Lemmon Survey	·	1.6 km	MPC · JPL
876991	2009 QW_{28}	—	June 17, 2009	Mount Lemmon	Mount Lemmon Survey	·	520 m	MPC · JPL
876992	2009 QP_{64}	—	August 27, 2009	Kitt Peak	Spacewatch	3:2	3.6 km	MPC · JPL
876993	2009 QK_{67}	—	August 20, 2009	La Sagra	OAM	·	550 m	MPC · JPL
876994	2009 QE_{77}	—	August 27, 2009	Kitt Peak	Spacewatch	·	1.4 km	MPC · JPL
876995	2009 RZ_{3}	—	September 14, 2009	Socorro	LINEAR	T_{j} (2.94) · APO · PHA	610 m	MPC · JPL
876996	2009 RL_{4}	—	August 18, 2009	Kitt Peak	Spacewatch	·	630 m	MPC · JPL
876997	2009 RY_{39}	—	September 15, 2009	Kitt Peak	Spacewatch	·	670 m	MPC · JPL
876998	2009 RB_{44}	—	September 15, 2009	Kitt Peak	Spacewatch	·	1.3 km	MPC · JPL
876999	2009 RW_{53}	—	September 15, 2009	Kitt Peak	Spacewatch	·	1.3 km	MPC · JPL
877000	2009 RN_{54}	—	September 15, 2009	Kitt Peak	Spacewatch	·	3.8 km	MPC · JPL

back to top
