= Demon (thought experiment) =

Category of thought experiment

In thought experiments, philosophers and scientists occasionally imagine entities with special abilities as a way to pose thought experiment or highlight apparent paradoxes.

The word "demon" here does not necessarily connote a demon, a malevolent being. For instance, James Clerk Maxwell came up with his thought experiment of a "finite being" manipulating entropy microscopically to highlight the implications of the statistical interpretation of thermodynamics. It was called Maxwell's demon by Lord Kelvin who used the term in analogy to daemons in Greek mythology, supernatural beings as unseen forces of nature.

== Notable examples ==
- Darwinian demon – Hypothetical organism which can simultaneously maximize all aspects of its fitness.
- Evil demon – Cartesian skepticism (also called methodological skepticism) advocates the doubting of all things that cannot be justified through logic. René Descartes uses three arguments to cast doubt on our ability to know objectively: the dream argument, the deceiving God argument, and the malicious demon argument. Since our senses cannot put us in contact with external objects themselves, but only with our mental images of such objects, we can have no absolute certainty that anything exists in the external world. In the evil demon argument Descartes proposes an entity who is capable of deceiving us to such a degree that we have reason to doubt the totality of what our senses tell us.
- Laplace's demon – Hypothetical all-knowing being who knows the precise location and momentum of every atom in the universe, and therefore could use Newton's laws to reveal the entire course of cosmic events, past and future. Pierre-Simon Laplace based the demon on the philosophical proposition of causal determinism. Roger Joseph Boscovich developed a more physical version of the same thought experiment, known as Boscovich's demon, based on position, velocity, direction and center of mass.
- Maxwell's demon – Hypothetical being that can distinguish between fast and slow moving molecules. If this demon only let fast moving molecules through a trapdoor to a container, the temperature inside the container would increase without any work being applied. According to James Clerk Maxwell, such a scenario seems to violate the second law of thermodynamics. Leo Szilard's refinement of Maxwell's demon in the context of information theory is sometimes referred to as Szilard's demon. The biological equivalent of Maxwell's "finite being" is a molecular demon. According to Landauer's principle, the demon must record the state of each molecule, and the eventual erasure of that information would return entropy to the system.
- In aphorism 341 of The Gay Science, Nietzsche puts forth his eternal recurrence concept. In it, he employs a demon with special metaphysical knowledge as an agent for forcing reevaluation of perspective on one's own life.
- Searle's demon – Homunculus-like being that reproduces intentional behaviour in someone's brain without neither the person nor the organism being intentional in themselves. It was conceptualized by philosopher of mind John Haugeland in criticizing John Searle's theory of biological naturalism.
- Morton's demon – Hypothetical being that stands at the gateway of a person's senses and lets in facts that agree with that person's beliefs while deflecting those that do not. This demon was devised by former Young Earth creationist Glenn Morton to explain the phenomenon of confirmation bias.
- Demon of bureaucratic chaos – Relates to the phenomenon that "blocks good things from happening" at the United States Department of Energy. This hypothesized entity makes it extremely difficult to complete complex projects — by frequently changing mission requirements, funding, and strategic direction. Examples include the Mirror Fusion Test Facility, which was constructed but never turned on; the Superconducting Super Collider, which cost $2 billion before its cancellation; and ITER, the international fusion experiment in France that the United States has alternately supported and opposed, and to which it has threatened withdrawal, cut funding, and increased funding over the decades.

== Similar entities ==
There are other creatures which feature in thought experiments about philosophy. One such creature is a utility monster, a creature which derives much more utility (such as enjoyment) from resources than other beings, and hence under a strict utilitarian system would have more or all of the available resources directed to it. Newcomb's paradox supposes a being who is believed to be capable of predicting human behavior; Robert Nozick suggested a "being from another planet, with an advanced technology and science, whom you know to be friendly".

Philosophical zombies are similar to Searle's Demon, above. The thought experiment posits humans with no form of soul, consciousness, or intentionality, but which react exactly the way a "normal" human might. Outwardly, they are indistinguishable from "normal" humans.

== See also ==
- Pines' demon
- Daemon (computing)
