= Jörg Stetefeld =

German biochemist

- Born: 1964 (age 61–62)

Academic background
- Education: Leipzig University, Technical University of Munich/Max Planck Institute of Biochemistry
- Thesis: Röntgenstrukturanalyse der LE-Module γ1 III 3-5 (1996)
- Doctoral advisor: Robert Huber
- Other advisor: Jürgen Engel

Academic work
- Discipline: Biochemistry, Structural biology, Biophysics
- Institutions: Biozentrum University of Basel, University of Manitoba

Jörg Stetefeld (born 1964) is a German biochemist and biophysicist, distinguished professor and holder of the Tier 1 Canada Research Chair in structural biology and biophysics at the Department of Chemistry, University of Manitoba, Canada, where he established a hybrid method approach for the integration of structural and cellular biology.

== Education and career ==
Stetefeld graduated in biochemistry from Leipzig University in 1990 and earned his Ph.D. at the Technical University of Munich in 1996 as a member of Robert Huber's group at the Max Planck Institute of Biochemistry in Martinsried. He conducted postdoctoral research in biophysics with Jürgen Engel at the Biozentrum, University of Basel, from 1999–2006 (habilitation and venia legendi in 2003), where he led a research group on "Structural and functional diversity generated by alternative mRNA" before joining the University of Manitoba faculty in 2006 (distinguished professor since 2025). In 2015 Stetefeld co-founded the Centre for Oil and Gas Research and Development (COGRAD), an internationally accredited analytical centre in environmental monitoring and remediation services, providing an eDNA laboratory to study animal habitats in the Canadian Arctic funded by the Canadian government’s Western Economic Diversification Fund.

In 2019 he established the Center for Integrated Structural Biophysics (CISB) providing a platform for structure-based drug design projects. Also in 2019 Stetefeld appeared as an expert witness before the Senate of Canada's special committee on the Arctic, testifying on the rapid environmental changes to the region and outlining the methods currently being used to monitor the environment. Stetefeld is founder and CEO of White Otter Biotech Inc.

In 2020 Stetefeld was one of the finalists in the global Falling Walls Science Summit Breakthroughs of the Year competition for his work on eDNA as non-invasive way to sample organisms in the Canadian Arctic.

Stetefeld serves on the editorial board of the Journal of Structural Biology.

== Research ==
Stetefeld's primary goal of research is to understand in detail the structure-property relationship of protein-protein and protein-ligand interaction networks. In structural biophysics he has worked on the exploration of structural dynamics of extracellular higher-order signaling complexes in cellular communication, having published the first high-resolution X-ray crystal structure of a signaling component, through which "[s]tructural studies of laminin entered the atomic age." Stetefeld expanded the study of individual protein domains towards complex, higher-order signaling assemblies. This included research into agrin-mediated neuromuscular junction formation as well as unraveling the effects of alternative mRNA splice inserts in muscular dystrophy. Adopting a hybrid method approach in structural biology to untangle higher order signaling clusters Stetefeld has contributed to structural biology of target systems by combining X-ray crystallography with complementary techniques like high-resolution NMR techniques. He has developed structure-function-applications of coiled coils, including the exploration of S-layer protein crystal structure from the archaea Staphylothermus marinus.
