= Darwinian demon =

Hypothetical organism resulting from unconstrained evolution

A Darwinian demon is a hypothetical organism that would result if there were no biological constraints on evolution. Such an organism would maximize all aspects of fitness simultaneously and would exist if there were no limitations from available variation or physiological constraints. It is named for the English scientist Charles Darwin, who first posited evolution in his work On the Origin of Species in 1859. Such organisms would reproduce directly after being born, produce infinitely many offspring, and live indefinitely. Even though no such organisms exist, biologists use Darwinian demons in thought experiments to understand different life history strategies among different organisms.

Darwinian demons (inspired by Maxwell's demons) have been seen in many articles. It personifies an entity that is able to consciously direct an organism’s evolution, allowing it to maximize all fitness components at once. Some organisms such as duckweed and queen ants mimic Darwinian demons; however, they fall short. An organism’s acquisition of adaptations is restricted by trade-offs, gene flow and a limited source of variation.

== See also ==
- Demon (thought experiment)
- Natural selection
