= Philip I. Marcus =

American virologist (1927–2013)

Philip Irving Marcus (June 3, 1927, in Springfield, Massachusetts – September 1, 2013, in Farmington, Connecticut) was an American virologist and a leader in interferon research. From 2003 he was a Board of Trustees Distinguished Professor of Molecular and Cell Biology at the University of Connecticut.

== Early life and education ==
Marcus was born June 3, 1927, in Springfield, Massachusetts, the son of Julius Marcus and Marley Spier (Sheffield, England), and the brother of Maxine Altshuler, and Emil Marcus. In 1945 he graduated Springfield Technical High School (which would later merge with Springfield Classical High School to form Springfield Central High School) the STEM system of its time. During World War II, while in high school, he worked at the great forges in the Springfield Armory immortalized by Longfellow's poem "The Arsenal at Springfield." He enlisted in the Army Specialized Training Reserve Program and was assigned in 1945 to attend the University of Connecticut in Storrs, Connecticut.

Marcus received his education directly as a result of the G.I. Bill. After six months each at the University of Connecticut and the University of Maine (in Orono) he had earned two years of college credit. Assigned to active duty in the US Air Force and stationed in Istres, France, he rose to the level of staff sergeant within a year. The GI Bill enabled him to attend college, the first in his family to do so. He took some courses in general education and engineering while serving in the United States Army Air Force in 1945–46 then, after a year with the US occupation forces in Europe, left the USAAF and studied for his BS in bacteriology in 1950 at the University of Southern California, his MS in microbiology in 1953 at the University of Chicago (where he first met Leó Szilárd) and earned his PhD microbiology/biophysics in 1957 from the University of Colorado Medical Center, where he also was an associate professor and worked with Theodore Puck.

== Career ==
While at the University of Chicago, he worked with Aaron Novick and Leó Szilárd and later with Paul Talalay. In Colorado, he co-discovered the clonogenic assay and the feeder cell system, making it possible to grow clones from single mammalian cells as in stem cells. He was the first to clone the immortalized HeLa cells. That procedure led to the first determination of human cell sensitivity to X-rays. Over fifty years later he documented that a luncheon conversation with Leó Szilárd, the nuclear physicist, led to the concept and physical setup for the first clonogenic assay. Dr. Marcus then spent nine years on the faculty of the Albert Einstein College of Medicine in NY supported by a ten-year U.S. Public Health Service Research Career Development Award. While there he showed the dynamic movement of virus molecules on the surface of infected cells, and with a pediatrician colleague, Dr. David Carver, developed a new test to detect rubella virus. During this time in New York, he was director for nine years of the post-doctoral course on quantitative animal virology and cell culture that was taught in the summer at Cold Spring Harbor Laboratory (NY).

In 1969 Marcus returned to the University of Connecticut, where he was appointed head of the Microbiology Section. He spent the remainder of his career at the University of Connecticut, where he administered the first Program Project on campus supported by the National Institute of Health, chaired the first Biosafety Committee, created a Virus and Interferon Research Laboratory recognized internationally for its innovative studies, published over 130 scientific papers, and was awarded five U.S. patents. As an early director of the Biotechnology Center, he helped attract companies with a focus on biotechnology to Connecticut. Then, for twelve years as director of the Biotechnology/ Services Center, he expanded the acquisition of state-of-the art instruments, which drew scientists to the facility. He continued to advance biotechnology in Connecticut as a charter member of the Connecticut Academy of Science and Engineering and was pleased to know that the Research Park planned for Storrs, Connecticut, will be realized. In 1987 he received the University of Connecticut Alumni Association Award for Excellence in Research, and in 2003 was recognized as a board of trustees distinguished professor. His annual course in virology, taught for thirty-six years, was both sought after, and evaded, the former by students looking to be challenged. These students were a source of great pride. Decades later he continued to receive accolades from students expressing appreciation for the opportunity to experience that challenge.

Marcus was a member and active participant in a number of professional scientific societies, including the American Society for Virology and the International Society for Interferon and Cytokine Research, which in 2005 named him as an honorary member. Serving eighteen years as editor-in-chief of the Journal of Interferon Research (later renamed the Journal of Interferon and Cytokine Research (JICR)), he went on to serve as senior consulting editor of the JICR for ten years. For twenty-five years he was an editor for the Journal of Cellular Physiology.

He typically mentored two Ph.D. candidates and two undergraduate honors students doing research in the lab. The bulk of his research at the University of Connecticut was in collaboration with long-time associate and faculty member, Dr. Margaret J. Sekellick. Three highlights included: the discovery of the world's most efficient inducer of interferon –a single molecule of double-stranded RNA; the molecular cloning of the first non-human interferon (avian); and the discovery that influenza virus populations contained previously unknown large subpopulations of noninfectious viruses that were nonetheless biologically active. He was an avid reader who, while developing ways to win the war between viruses and cells, imagined how humankind would lose if we destroyed ourselves first. He showed palatable disdain for politicians who did not appreciate the role of basic science in understanding and caring for the world and its many inhabitants. Marcus died on September 1, 2013, at the age of eighty-six. He had spent the past forty-four years on the faculty at the University of Connecticut, known to many as a compassionate professor who donated his time unselfishly to colleagues and students through his research, teaching and service.

== Research ==
In 1955 he co-authored a paper on "the first practical and efficient method for growing colonies from individual animal cells", known as the clonogenic assay, which is still used today.

He was also the first person to clone HeLa cells, and was editor-in-chief of the Journal of Interferon and Cytokine Research for 18 years.

Marcus gives credit to Leó Szilárd for inspiring this achievement in both an interview for Genius in the Shadows, a biography of Szilárd, and in the This Week in Virology 2012 interview.

Marcus' further career included positions at the Albert Einstein College of Medicine, the Cold Spring Harbor Laboratory and the Salk Institute.

The primary focus of his research from 1966 until his death was in the field of interferon research. 'His Virus and Interferon Research Laboratory at UConn's Torrey Life Sciences Building became the leading proponent of the theory that double-stranded ribonucleic acid, dsRNA, is the inducer of interferon, and that just one molecule of dsRNA is enough to induce interferon production in a cell, thus activating a cell's response to a virus.'
