= Genius in the Shadows =

1992 book by William Lanouette

- Author: William Lanouette
- Language: English
- Subject: Leo Szilard
- Genre: Biography
- Publisher: Scribner's Sons
- Publication date: 1992
- Publication place: United States

Genius in the Shadows is a 1992 biography of Leo Szilard by William Lanouette. Leo Szilard was a Hungarian-German-American physicist who is most well known for discovering the nuclear chain reaction. The book covers Szilard's personal life and his work.

== Synopsis ==
The book highlights Szilard being overlooked throughout history yet he was the one to discover the nuclear chain reaction. Szilard was born in Hungary and grew up in Berlin before fleeing Hitler's regime in 1933. That same year Szilard devised the idea that would nickname him the "father of the atom bomb". He did his best to keep this idea to himself but the threat of another world war led him to speak to Albert Einstein about it. This new concept of a chain reaction brought about new ideas, one being the nuclear bomb, but Szilard had always hoped this idea would lead to a new energy source so humanity would not have to rely on fossil fuels. Harnessing the power from a nuclear chain reaction opened up the possibility for endless new ideas.

Leo Szilard warned Albert Einstein about what could become of this new idea and together they pressured the US government into researching atomic reactions. Szilard would later work with the likes of Albert Einstein, Enrico Fermi, and Robert Oppenheimer on the Manhattan Project. The United States of America was the founder of this group with their main goal being to create the first nuclear weapon. Franklin Delano Roosevelt approved this project and assigned Robert Oppenheimer to be in charge. This project was where the first nuclear weapons would be created. At this point Szilard could only minimize the damage his idea was soon to insure. There was a point after the Manhattan Project when Szilard pushed to outlaw nuclear weapons as a whole.

Szilard's life did not only consist of physics and ideas stemming from his nuclear chain reaction. He was interested in biology, especially in dolphins. Szilard wrote The Voice of the Dolphins: And Other Stories which debuted in 1961. A year later he founded the Council for a Livable World which was the first political action committee for arms control. He spent his final days at The Salk Institute for Biological Studies in La Jolla, California, which was developed by incorporating the concepts of science and social studies.

This biography can help to humanize the physicist that brought forward such a polarizing idea. Readers get a chance to understand the scientist and the intentions behind his ideas. Szilard's ideas led to many others' success and awards. This book gives an inside view of the type of person Szilard was and the impact he made on others.

== Editions ==
- Lanouette, W (1992), Genius in the Shadows, US: C. Scribner's Sons
- Lanouette, W (1994), Genius in the Shadows, US: University of Chicago Press
- Lanouette, W (2013), Genius in the Shadows, US: Skyhorse

== Reception ==
Genius in the Shadows received favorable reviews from Publishers Weekly, Nature, New York Times Book Review, New York Review of Books and others.
