= Leószilárdite =

Mineral

General
- Category: Carbonate mineral
- Formula: Na_{6}Mg(UO_{2})_{2}(CO_{3})_{6}·6H_{2}O
- IMA symbol: Lsz
- Crystal system: Monoclinic
- Crystal class: 2/m - Prismatic

Identification
- Color: Pale yellow or tan

Leószilárdite is a mineral discovered by Travis Olds of the University of Notre Dame and colleagues in the Markey Mine in Utah, USA. They named the mineral in honor of Leó Szilárd, Hungarian-born physicist and inventor. Leószilárdite is the first naturally occurring sodium- and magnesium-containing uranyl carbonate. It is rare and water-soluble, and was discovered on a seam of carbon-rich material deposited by an ancient stream. Groundwater reacted with the uraninite ore to create leószilárdite and other minerals.

== Localities ==
USA: Markey Mine, Red Canyon, White Canyon District, San Juan County, Utah
