= Szilard point =

Grant proposal cost-benefit analyses

In cost-benefit analyses of scientific grant proposals, the Szilard Point refers to the scenario in which the expenses incurred in obtaining a grant (E) are equal to the value of the awarded grant (V). Beyond this point, where the costs outweigh the benefits (E > V), the return on investment for pursuing the grant becomes negative.

Because the Szilard Point is more of a qualitative construct than a quantitative measure, and because the concept is rooted in a fictional story, the term has acquired several divergent meanings, such as the point at which tasks other than research, such as applying for grants, peer review, and handling administrative chores, would consume more time and resources than research itself. All definitions, however, allude to the decrease in the probability of obtaining research funding and the increase in bureaucratic burdens encountered in academia.

== Origin of the term ==
The term Szilard Point was coined in 1988 by Richard Smith (then assistant editor of British Medical Journal), and independently in 1990 by Daryl E. Chubin (then staff member at the Science, Education, and Transportation Program, Office of Technology Assessment, Congress of the United States) and Edward J. Hackett (then associate professor, Department of Science and Technology Studies, Rensselaer Polytechnic Institute).

Szilard Point was named after physicist Leo Szilard, who in 1948 wrote a short story entitled “The Mark Gable Foundation.” The story was published in a collection of short stories entitled The Voice of the Dolphins in 1961.

== Szilard Point, Grant Proposals, and Peer Review ==
Szilard Point (whether by name or by implication) has frequently been used in arguments against the practice of peer review in judging grant proposals. In 1984, Rostum Roy, a material scientist at Penn State University, used the following real-life example to illustrate the wastefulness of this system.

== The implicit use of Szilard Point ==
The study of the bureaucratic factors retarding scientific progress, has become quite fashionable after 2000. The term Szilard Point is not mentioned in most such studies.

== Examples of the Szilard Point ==
Funding schemes where the total time spent by applicants likely exceeded the awarded grant value.

- An ACSPRI fellowship had 100 and 160 applicants for a total value of AUD $25,000. Meaning E > V if applicants spent an average of 2 days on their application.
- A Johnson & Johnson women in STEMM fellowship had 650 applicants for 6 awards with a total value of USD $900,000. Meaning E > V if applicants spent an average of 7 days on their application.
