= My Trial as a War Criminal =

1949 short story by Leo Szilard

"My Trial as a War Criminal" is a 1949 short story by atomic physicist Leo Szilard. Szilard had played a leading role in the Manhattan Project, and in the story he imagines the kind of show trial he might have had if he had been prosecuted in a manner similar to the Nuremberg Trials. Szilard earlier drafted the letter Albert Einstein signed, to Franklin Roosevelt, suggesting the US develop the military uses of nuclear power, and later the petition unsuccessfully advocating against the use of nuclear weapons.

== Synopsis ==
The story is set after World War II, shortly after the United States has surrendered to the Soviet Union following a sneak attack using germ warfare.

Szilard is offered a choice: He can volunteer to work on scientific projects in the Soviet Union, or he can remain in the United States, and stand trial as a war criminal for his role in the development and use of the first atomic bombs during the Second World War.

Szilard chooses to stand trial. During his trial the record of his opposition to dropping the atomic bomb on civilian targets is dismissed, on the grounds that he had drafted classified documents where he may have taken the opposite position, and he is convicted.

Szilard is allowed to attend the trials of United States President Harry S. Truman, Secretary of War Henry Stimson, and the Secretary of State. Truman's attorney tries to argue that Truman's order for the use of atomic bombs on Japan was no more of a war crime than the Soviet use of biological weapons that led to the American surrender had been. Truman's tribunal convicts him of a violation of laws and customs of war, because, prior to 1945, it had not been customary to drop atomic bombs on cities.

== Aftermath ==
When the story was published in the 1961 edition of Szilard's collection, The Voice of the Dolphins, and Other Stories, the book stated that the story was required reading for students at Harvard Law School. According to William Lanouette speaking at the 2005 World Science Forum in Budapest, a Russian language translation of Szilard's story played a key role in Soviet physicist Andrei Sakharov's objections to the Soviet nuclear weapons program.
