= Jürgen Engel =

Swiss chemist

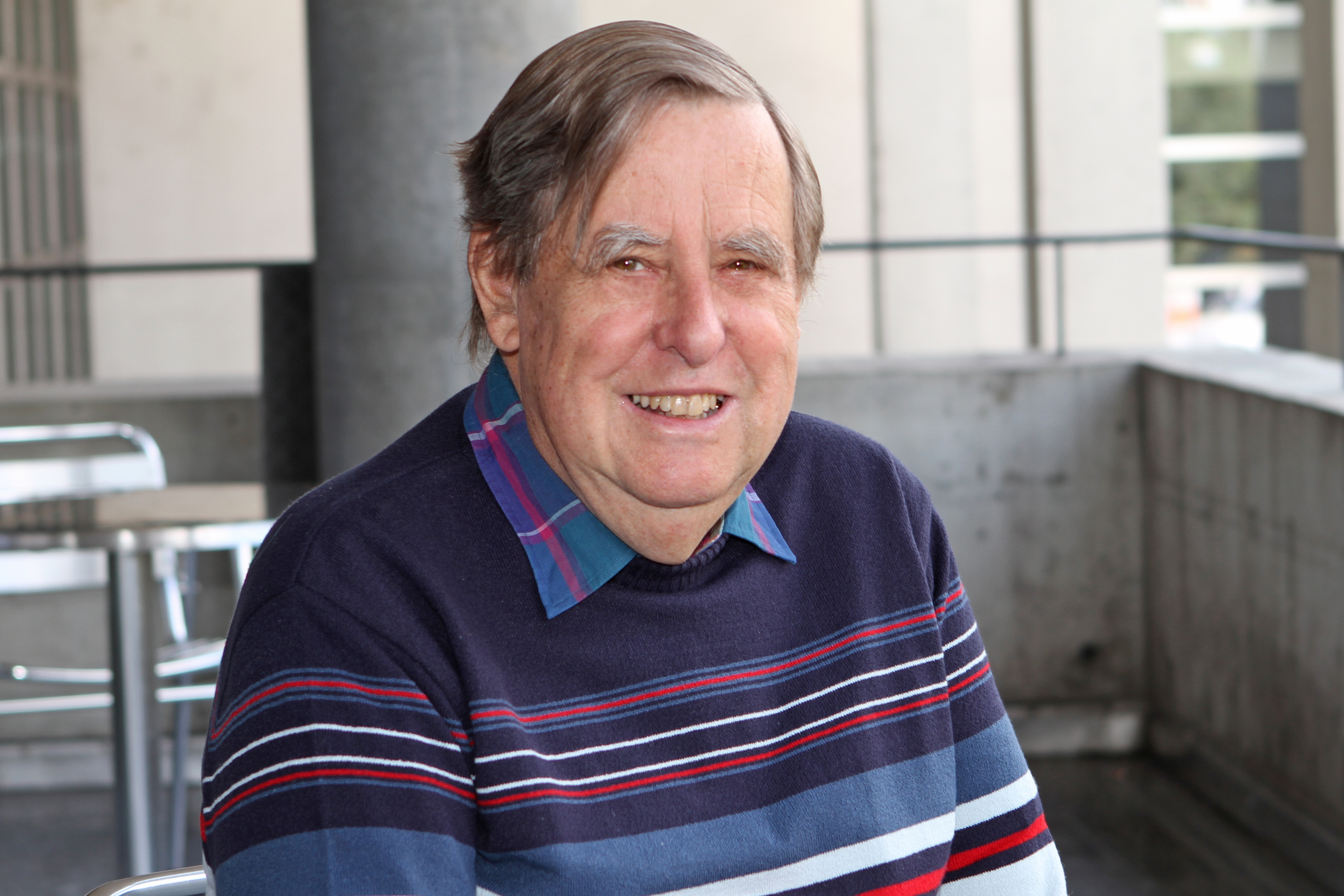
- Engel in 2014
- Born: 15 March 1935 (age 91); Berlin, Germany
- Scientific career
- Fields: Chemist
- Workplaces: Max Planck Society, Weizmann Institute of Science, Max Planck Institute for Chemistry, Biozentrum University of Basel

Jürgen Engel (born 15 March 1935 in Berlin) is a German-born Swiss chemist and biophysicist.

== Life ==
Jürgen Engel is professor emeritus of biophysical chemistry. After studying chemistry, he received his doctorate in 1962 from the Max Planck Institute for Protein and Leather Research, Munich. A position as a visiting scientist at the Weizmann Institute in Israel followed. From 1965 to 1966 Engel worked with Prof. Manfred Eigen, a Nobel laureate in chemistry, at the MPI for Biophysical Chemistry, Göttingen, then returned to the MPI for Protein and Leather Research to lead his own research group. From 1972 until 2004, when he reached emeritus status, he taught and conducted research in the Division of Biophysical Chemistry at the Biozentrum of the University of Basel. He was chairman of the institute for two years as well as Dean of the Faculty of Science. After his retirement from the Biozentrum he worked in the Research Department of Shriners Hospital for Children in Portland, Oregon.

== Work ==
Jürgen Engel studied the extracellular matrix and adhesion and receptor proteins on the cell surface, which play an important role in cell communication. Using physical methods, such as circular dichroism, X-ray crystallography, nuclear magnetic resonance spectroscopy and electron microscopy he elucidated the function, structure and dynamics of collagens, laminins and other matrix proteins. His group uncovered the mechanisms by which the α-helical coiled-coil domains of laminin connect three chains and mediate the association of the neuronal protein Agrin. For the matrix protein COMP, they found a channel-forming five-stranded coiled-coil domain. Furthermore, in genetic disorders such as Osteogenesis imperfecta the folding of the collagen triple helix and the recognition of the correct combination of the three chains are seriously disrupted due to mutations. Engel was committed to solving these problems throughout his whole career. Furthermore, he uncovered the mechanism of the homophilic interaction of extracellular domains of E-cadherin.

== Notable publications ==
- Versatile Collagens in Invertebrates. In: Science. 277 (1997), S. 1785–1786. PMID 9324767
- mit K. Mizuno, S. Boudko und H. P. Bächinger: Vascular Ehlers-Danlos syndrome mutations in type III collagen differently stall the triple helical folding. In: J Biol Chem. 288 (2013), S. 19166–19176. PMID 23645670
- Biophysik-der physikalische Zugang zu biologischen Problemen. In: Physik Journal. 41, 1985, S. 327–328, doi:10.1002/phbl.19850411003.
- mit Ueli Aebi (Hrsg.): Cytoskeletal and Extracellular Proteins: Structure, Interactions and Assembly The 2nd International E.B.S.A. Symposium. (= Springer Series in Biophysics. 3). Springer, Berlin/ Heidelberg 1989, ISBN 3-642-73925-3.
- A Critical Survey of Biomineralization. In: Springer Briefs in Applied Science and Technology 2017, ISBN 978-3-319-47710-7.
