= Theodore Puck =

American geneticist

- Born: September 24, 1916; Chicago, Illinois
- Died: November 6, 2005 (aged 89); Denver, Colorado
- Education: University of Chicago
- Known for: Genetics, cell cloning, human karyotype
- Awards: Albert Lasker Award for Basic Medical Research (1958); Louisa Gross Horwitz Prize (1973); E.B. Wilson Medal (1984)
- Scientific career
- Fields: Genetics
- Workplaces: University of Chicago, University of Colorado School of Medicine
- Doctoral advisor: James Franck

Theodore Thomas Puck (September 24, 1916 – November 6, 2005) was an American geneticist born in Chicago, Illinois. He attended Chicago public schools and obtained his bachelors, masters, and doctoral degree from the University of Chicago. His PhD work was on the laws governing the impact of an electron upon an atom and his doctoral adviser was James Franck. During WW II Puck stayed at the University of Chicago. There he worked in the laboratory of Oswald H. Robertson on the study of how bacteria and viruses can spread through the air and on dust particles. After a postdoc position in the laboratory of Renato Dulbecco, Puck was recruited in 1948 to establish and chair the University of Colorado School of Medicine's department of biophysics. He retired from the University of Colorado School of Medicine in 1995 as professor emeritus, but continued to do laboratory work there until a few weeks before his death.

Puck was an early pioneer of "somatic cell genetics" and single-cell plating ( i.e. "cloning" .) This work allowed the genetics of human and other mammalian cells to be studied in detail. Puck's key work ultimately made modern genetics, such as the human genome and other mammalian genome projects, possible. Dr. Puck with the assistance of Philip I. Marcus, successfully cloned a HeLa cell in 1955.

Puck made many basic discoveries in several areas. Confirming research done in 1956 by Joe Hin Tjio, Puck's team found that humans had 46 chromosomes rather than 48 which had earlier been believed. He developed the CHO cell line from Chinese hamster ovarian cells for this work and contributed to deeper insights into chromosomes and genetics of mammalian cells. Derived CHO cell lines became the most productive manufacturing approach for therapeutic proteins, resulting in hundreds of highly efficient drugs. Puck studied X-rays and cellular mutations. He also isolated and studied cellular mutations.

Puck has won a number of honors for his work most notably the Albert Lasker Award for Basic Medical Research in 1958. In 1973 he was awarded the Louisa Gross Horwitz Prize from Columbia University together with Renato Dulbecco and Harry Eagle. Dulbecco won the Nobel Prize in medicine in 1975. Puck also founded the Eleanor Roosevelt Institute at the University of Denver, where he was an emeritus professor. A member of the National Academy of Sciences since 1960, Puck published more than 200 papers on topics including Alzheimer's disease and Down syndrome, and optimising radiotherapy dosages for the treatment of cancer.

He died following complications from a broken hip. Upon his death he was survived by his widow, three daughters, and seven grandchildren.

== Awards ==
- 1958 Albert Lasker Award for Basic Medical Research
- 1960 Member of the National Academy of Sciences
- 1973 Louisa Gross Horwitz Prize
- 1974 Member of the Institute of Medicine
- 1984 E.B. Wilson Medal
