= Aaron Novick =

American molecular biologist (1919–2000)

- Born: June 24, 1919; Toledo, Ohio, United States
- Died: December 21, 2000 (aged 81); Eugene, Oregon, United States
- Education: University of Chicago
- Known for: chemostat feedback inhibition
- Scientific career
- Fields: Chemistry, Molecular Biology
- Workplaces: University of Chicago; Metallurgical Laboratory; Los Alamos Laboratory; University of Oregon
- Thesis: I. A kinetic study of the chromic acid oxidation of isopropyl alcohol. II. The iodination of fibroin. (1943)

Aaron Novick (June 24, 1919 – December 21, 2000) was an American molecular biologist, considered to be one of the founders of the field. He started the University of Oregon's Institute of Molecular Biology, believed to be the first of its kind in the world, in 1959.

A graduate of the University of Chicago, he completed his doctorate in physical organic chemistry there in 1943, and then joined the Manhattan Project's Metallurgical Laboratory. He later worked at its Los Alamos Laboratory, and witnessed the Trinity nuclear test in July 1945.

== Early life ==
Aaron Novick was born in Toledo, Ohio, on June 24, 1919, the son of Polish immigrants Sam and Rose Haring Novick. His father worked as a tailor. He had two sisters, Esther and Mary, and a brother, Meyer. In 1936, he and Meyer built a telescope to watch Peltier's comet. Later that year, they built a larger telescope, for which they painstakingly ground a 6.5 inches (170 mm) lens. He attended Woodward High School, where he played on the football team and was editor of the student newspaper. He graduated in 1937, and was elected to its Hall of Fame in 1986.

Novick was awarded a scholarship by the University of Chicago, where he earned a Bachelor of Science (SB) degree in chemistry in 1940. He went to on complete his Doctor of Philosophy (PhD) there, writing his two-part 1943 thesis on "A kinetic study of the chromic acid oxidation of isopropyl alcohol" and "The iodination of fibroin".

== Manhattan Project ==
After completing his degree, Novick joined the Manhattan Project's Metallurgical Laboratory at the University of Chicago, where he worked on the design of the nuclear reactors at the Hanford Site in Eastern Washington that were used to produce plutonium for atomic bombs. He was then transferred to the Project's Los Alamos Laboratory in New Mexico, where he worked on the preparations for the Trinity nuclear test, witnessing the blast on July 16, 1945. "I will never forget the sight of that explosion", he later told his parents, "the thing is really terrific".

A similar bomb was used in the bombing of Nagasaki on August 9, 1945. He later expressed regret that he and his fellow scientists did not pay much attention to the moral and ethical issues of the use of nuclear weapons, as they were absorbed in the urgency and importance of their work, and fixated on the grim casualties lists in the newspapers.

After the war ended, Novick returned to Chicago, where he worked with Herbert L. Anderson at the Manhattan Project's Argonne National Laboratory, studying the properties of tritium, an important component in nuclear weapons. Tritium could be manufactured in nuclear reactors and used to produce helium-3, a crucial material in cryogenics research and in neutron detection. They measured the magnetic moment of both tritium and helium-3, and Novick measured the half-life of tritium.

== Later life ==
In 1947, Novick became an associate professor at the University of Chicago. He teamed up with Leo Szilard, with whom he had worked at the Metallurgical Laboratory during the war. Szilard had secured a research professorship at the University of Chicago that allowed him to dabble in biology and the social sciences. The two men saw biology as a field that had not been explored as much as physics, and that was ready for scientific breakthroughs. They made considerable advances. They invented the chemostat, a device for regulating the growth rate of the microorganisms in a bioreactor, and developed methods for measuring the growth rate of bacteria. They discovered feedback inhibition, an important factor in processes such as growth and metabolism.

Novick married Jane Graham, a 1945 University of Chicago alumna, in Chicago on January 25, 1948. They had two sons, David and Adam. In 1953, he spent a year at the Pasteur Institute in Paris as a Guggenheim Fellow. He left the University of Chicago in 1958 and moved to Eugene, Oregon, where he became director of the new Institute of Molecular Biology at the University of Oregon on January 1, 1959. It is believed to be the first research institute in the world to include "molecular biology" in its title, and Novick is considered one of the founders of molecular biology.

Franklin W. Stahl, one of the researchers that Novick recruited, said that "I think his life's major achievement was the wisdom in which he guided this institute. He went for a model of an intellectual commune, where ideas could be aggressively shared between research groups." Novick built the Institute up from a single laboratory with one staff member, himself, to a multimillion-dollar research institute with many laboratories and dozens of research staff. He investigated the processes by which genes are switched on and off, demonstrating that when one is turned on, it causes synthesis of messenger RNA, while when one is turned off, a protein must bind to the gene. He was posthumously awarded the Medical Research Foundation of Oregon's Pioneer Award.

For many years, Novick participated actively in the Atomic Scientists movement, and he served on the editorial board of the Bulletin of the Atomic Scientists. In 1969, he was part of a successful campaign by Eugene residents to prevent the Eugene Water & Electric Board from switching to nuclear power. He was opposed to the Vietnam War, and at a meeting of the Arms Control Forum he was jeered by students shouting "Go back to Russia, you commies!"

Novick's career as a researcher ended when he became Dean of the Graduate School in 1971. He subsequently served as head of the Biology Department and as director of the Institute of Molecular Biology again. He retired in 1984, but remained director on a part-time basis until he became a professor emeritus in 1990. In later life he was afflicted with Parkinson's disease. He died from pneumonia in Eugene on December 21, 2000. He was survived by his ex-wife and two sons. He had been asked what he would like to have said about him at a memorial service. He said: "Tell them I was honest and a Democrat."
