= Landauer's principle =

Physical lower limit to energy consumption of computation

Landauer's principle is a physical principle pertaining to a lower theoretical limit of energy consumption of computation. It holds that an irreversible change in information stored in a computer, such as merging two computational paths, dissipates a minimum amount of heat to its surroundings. In the formulation of Charles H. Bennett, any logically irreversible manipulation of information, such as the erasure of a bit or the merging of two computation paths, must be accompanied by a corresponding entropy increase in non-information-bearing degrees of freedom of the information-processing apparatus or its environment; the entropy thus resides in the physical hardware and its surroundings, not in the bit as a logical entity. It is hypothesized that energy consumption below this lower bound would require the development of reversible computing.

The principle was first proposed by Rolf Landauer in 1961.

== Statement ==
Landauer's principle states that the minimum energy needed to erase one bit of information is proportional to the temperature at which the system is operating. Specifically, the energy needed for this computational task is given by

$$E \geq k_\text{B} T \ln 2,$$

where $k_\text{B}$ is the Boltzmann constant and $T$ is the absolute temperature. At room temperature, the Landauer limit represents an energy of approximately 0.018 eV (2.9×10^{−21} J). As of 2012, modern computers use about a billion times as much energy per operation.

The bound refers to the physical system that stores the bit: erasure resets a memory that may be in either of two distinguishable physical states into a fixed state, regardless of its initial state. Whether, and how much, heat is actually dissipated depends on the physical implementation rather than on the logical operation as such.

== History ==
Rolf Landauer first proposed the principle in 1961 while working at IBM. He justified and stated important limits to an earlier conjecture by John von Neumann. This refinement is sometimes called the Landauer bound, or Landauer limit.

In 2008 and 2009, researchers showed that Landauer's principle can be derived from the second law of thermodynamics and the entropy change associated with information gain, developing the thermodynamics of quantum and classical feedback-controlled systems.

In 2011, the principle was generalized to show that while information erasure requires an increase in entropy, this increase could theoretically occur at no energy cost. Instead, the cost can be taken in another conserved quantity, such as angular momentum.

In a 2012 article published in Nature, a team of physicists from the École normale supérieure de Lyon, University of Augsburg and the University of Kaiserslautern described that for the first time they have measured the tiny amount of heat released when an individual bit of data is erased.

In 2014, a high-precision test using a colloidal particle in a feedback trap confirmed its predictions.

In 2016, researchers used a laser probe to measure the amount of energy dissipation that resulted when a nanomagnetic bit flipped from off to on. Flipping the bit required about 0.026 eV (4.2×10^{−21} J) at 300 K, which is just 44% above the Landauer minimum.

A 2018 article published in Nature Physics features a Landauer erasure performed at cryogenic temperatures (T = 1 K) on an array of high-spin (S = 10) quantum molecular magnets. The array is made to act as a spin register where each nanomagnet encodes a single bit of information. The experiment has laid the foundations for the extension of the validity of the Landauer principle to the quantum realm. Owing to the fast dynamics and low "inertia" of the single spins used in the experiment, the researchers also showed how an erasure operation can be carried out at the lowest possible thermodynamic cost—that imposed by the Landauer principle—and at a high speed.

The bound k_{B}T ln 2 applies only to arbitrarily slow erasure. In 2020, Proesmans, Ehrich and Bechhoefer showed that erasing a bit in a finite time τ requires additional work that decreases in proportion to 1/τ, so that the Landauer limit is reached only in the quasistatic limit; the operating speed of the hardware therefore enters the minimum cost directly.

== Challenges ==
The principle is widely accepted as physical law, but it has been challenged for using circular reasoning and faulty assumptions. Others have defended the principle, and Sagawa and Ueda (2008) and Cao and Feito (2009) have shown that Landauer's principle is a consequence of the second law of thermodynamics and the entropy reduction associated with information gain.

On the other hand, recent advances in non-equilibrium statistical physics have established that there is no a priori relationship between logical reversibility (whether the input of an operation can be uniquely reconstructed from its output) and thermodynamic reversibility (whether the physical process implementing it produces no entropy). Logical reversibility is a property of the computation itself, i.e. of the abstract mapping from inputs to outputs, whereas thermodynamic reversibility is a property of the physical process, i.e. the hardware, that implements it. The two can therefore differ: a logically reversible computation can be implemented by a thermodynamically irreversible process, and a logically irreversible computation by a thermodynamically reversible one. Whether implementing a computation with a logically reversible system actually saves energy therefore depends on the physical implementation; the benefits are not automatic.

== See also ==
- Quantum speed limit
- Bremermann's limit
- Bekenstein bound
- Kolmogorov complexity
- Entropy in thermodynamics and information theory
- Information theory
- Jarzynski equality
- Limits of computation
- Extended mind thesis
- Maxwell's demon
- Koomey's law
- No-deleting theorem
