= Demon (disambiguation) =

A demon is a malevolent supernatural being, evil spirit or fiend in religion, occultism, literature, fiction, mythology and folklore.

Demon, daemon or dæmon may also refer to:

== Entertainment ==
=== Fictional entities and role-playing games ===
- Daemon (G.I. Joe)
- Dæmon (His Dark Materials)
- Daemon (Digimon)
- Demon (Dungeons & Dragons)
- Demon (Supernatural)
- Daemon, a character in the TV series ReBoot
- Daemon Blackfyre, a character in George R. R. Martin's A Song of Ice and Fire universe and its adaptations
- Daemon Targaryen, a character in George R. R. Martin's A Song of Ice and Fire universe and its adaptations
- Demons (Shannara)
- Demon or dimension traveler, class of characters in the MythAdventures series
- Characters in the Artemis Fowl series
- Characters which appear in The Demonata by Darren Shan
- Azazel (Supernatural), fictional character also known as "The Demon"
- Etrigan the Demon
- Demons (Mayfair Games), a 1992 role-playing game supplement for demons in Advanced Dungeons & Dragons
- The Demon, the antagonist of a 1976 episode of The Scooby-Doo Show, "A Frightened Hound Meets Demons Underground"

=== Films ===
- The Demon (1918 film), an American silent comedy
- The Demon (1926 film), an American silent Western film
- The Demon (1963 film), an Italian horror-drama film
- Demons, a 1971 Japanese film directed by Toshio Matsumoto
- Demon (1976 film) or God Told Me To, an American horror film
- The Demon (1978 film), a Japanese drama
- The Demon (South African film), a slasher film
- Demons (1985 film), an Italian horror film
- Daemon (film), a 1985 British horror film
- Demon (2015 film), a Polish drama
- Demons (2017 film), an American horror film
- Demon (2023 film), an Indian Tamil-language horror film

=== Publications ===
- Demon (comics), a comic by Jason Shiga
- The Demon, a DC Comics series starring Etrigan the Demon

=== Music ===
==== Performers ====
- Daemon (band), co-founded by Nicke Andersson of The Hellacopters
- Demon (band), English metal band formed in 1979
- Demons (band), Swedish punk band
- Demon Kakka, formerly known as Demon Kogure, Japanese musician

==== Labels and radio stations ====
- Demon Music Group, British record label
- Daemon Records, an independent record label
- Demon FM, community radio station in Leicestershire

==== Albums ====
- Demon (album), 2014, by Gazpacho
- Demons (Candlelight Red EP), 2012
- Demons (Cowboy Junkies album), 2011
- Demons (From Her Eyes EP), 2014
- Demons (Get Scared album), 2015
- Demons (Spiritual Beggars album), 2005
- Demon, by Envelopes
- Demons, 2020, by Nathan Cavaleri
- Daemon (album), 2019, by Mayhem

==== Songs ====
- "Demons" (A$AP Rocky song)
- "Demon" (King Von song)
- "Demon" (Jay Park song)
- "Demons" (Doja Cat song)
- "Demons" (Fatboy Slim song)
- "Demons" (Guster song)
- "Demons" (Imagine Dragons song)
- "Demons" (Brian McFadden song)
- "Demons" (James Morrison song)
- "Demons" (The National song)
- "Demons" (Sleigh Bells song)
- "Demons" (Super Furry Animals song)
- "Demons" (Josiah Queen song)
- "Demon8", by Mercenary on album First Breath
- "Demon", bonus track by Trivium on album Ember to Inferno
- "Demon", by KYPCK on album Cherno
- "Daemon", by Whitechapel on album This is Exile
- "Demons", by Avenged Sevenfold on album Diamonds in the Rough
- "Demons", by Fenech-Soler
- "Demons", by Mayday Parade on album Monsters in the Closet
- "Demons", by The Wanted on album Word of Mouth
- "Demons", by Blue Stahli on album The Devil
- "Demons", by Lil Wayne on album Tha Carter V
- "Demons", by Kim Petras on album Turn Off the Light
- "Demons", by Hayley Kiyoko on album I'm Too Sensitive for This Shit
- "Demons", by Alec Benjamin on album These Two Windows
- "Demons", by Drake on album Dark Lane Demo Tapes
- "Demons", by Gothminister on album Pandemonium
- "Demons", by Mutoid Man on album Mutants

=== Books ===
- Daemon (novel), 2006, by Daniel Suarez
- Demon (comics), a 2014–2016 comic series by Jason Shiga
- Demon (novel), 1984, by John Varley
- Demon, a 2003 novel by Christopher Nicole
- Demon: A Memoir, a 2007 novel by Tosca Lee
- Demon and Other Tales, a 1996 collection by Joyce Carol Oates
- Demons (Dostoevsky novel), 1872, by Fyodor Dostoevsky
- Demons (Dillard novel), a 1986 Star Trek: The Original Series novel by J.M. Dillard
- Demons, a 1987 novel by Guy N. Smith
- Demons, a 1993 novel by Bill Pronzini
- Demons, a 2000 novella by John Shirley
- Demons!, a 1987 anthology edited by Jack Dann and Gardner Dozois
- The Daemon, a 1977 novel by Peter Tuesday Hughes
- The Demon, 1976, by Eve Bunting
- The Demon (novel), 1976, by Hubert Selby Jr.
- The Demon, a 2003–2004 two-part Star Trek novel by Loren L. Coleman and Randall L. Bills; the 35th and 36th installment in the Corps of Engineers series
- The Demons, reissue title of Demons' World, a 1964 novel by Kenneth Bulmer

=== Television ===
==== Programs ====
- Demons (TV series), a British TV series which aired in 2009
- The Dæmons, a 1971 Doctor Who serial

==== Episodes ====
- "Demon" (Star Trek: Voyager), 1998
- "Demons" (Star Trek: Enterprise), 2005
- "Demons" (Stargate SG-1)
- "Demons" (The X-Files)
- "eps1.3_da3m0ns.mp4", a 2015 episode of Mr. Robot
- "The Demon" (Arrow)
- "The Demon" (Yu-Gi-Oh! GX)

== Computing ==
- Daemon (computing), a background process
- Daemon Tools, a disk image emulator
- Daemontools, a collection of free tools for managing Unix services
- Demon Internet, an Internet service provider
- BSD Daemon, a mascot for the BSD operating system

== Religion, philosophy and mythology ==
=== Religion ===
- Unclean spirit, an agent of a demonic possession

=== Philosophy ===
- Demon (thought experiment), a class of hypotheses
  - Laplace's demon (1814), articulation of causal or scientific determinism by Pierre-Simon Laplace
  - Maxwell's demon, a concept by James Clerk Maxwell concerning the statistics of second law of thermodynamics
  - Evil demon, a philosophical concept originating with René Descartes
  - Darwinian Demon, a hypothetical organism resulting from absence of biological constraints on evolution

=== Mythology ===
- Daemon (classical mythology), a lesser deity or guiding spirit in ancient Greek religion and mythology

== People ==
- Demon (musician) (born 1977), French electronic musician
- Demon June, American football player
- Blue Demon (1922–2000), a professional wrestler and actor
- Finn Bálor (born 1981), nicknamed "The Demon" in WWE
- Kane (wrestler) (born 1967), wrestler for WWE and WWF
- Alex de Minaur (born 1999), Australian tennis player nicknamed "Demon"
- Dale Torborg (born 1971), professional wrestler performing in WCW under the name "The Demon"
- Gene Simmons (born 1948), vocalist and bassist for the rock band Kiss, whose stage persona is "The Demon"

== Places ==
- Demon (volcano), Iturup Island, Kuril Islands, Russia
- Demon, Togo
- Demon Creek, a stream in Alaska
- Algol, a star known colloquially as "the demon star"

== Sports ==
=== Basketball ===
- DePaul Blue Demons men's basketball, Chicago, Illinois
- Wake Forest Demon Deacons men's basketball, North Carolina
- Northwestern State Demons basketball, Natchitoches, Louisiana
- Northwestern State Lady Demons basketball, Natchitoches, Louisiana
- UCC Demons, Irish basketball team

=== Football and rugby ===
- Cardiff Demons, a Welsh rugby league team
- Casey Demons, an Australian rules football team
- Melbourne Football Club, an Australian rules football team nicknamed the Demons
- Northwestern State Demons football, Natchitoches, Louisiana
- Perth Football Club, an Australian rules football team nicknamed the Demons

== Science ==
- Demon bat, common name for the Beelzebub's tube-nosed bat
- Demon butterflies, several species of the butterfly tribe Ancistroidini
- Demon owl, common name for the barn owl
- Molecular demon, molecular arrangements that mimic Maxwell's demon
- Pines' demon, a certain type of collective excitation of electrons

== Other ==
- Canfield (solitaire) or Demon, a solitaire/patience card game
- Dæmonen, a roller coaster at Tivoli Gardens
- Demon (roller coaster), at Six Flags Great America and California's Great America
- Screamin' Demon, a shuttle loop roller coaster at Kings Island in Ohio
- Demon (poem), by Mikhail Lermontov
- The Demon (opera), by Anton Rubinstein
- Demon (UAV), an aircraft built by BAE Systems
- McDonnell F3H Demon, a US Navy fighter aircraft
- Hawker Demon, a Royal Air Force biplane
- Demons (board game), a 1979 fantasy game
- Dodge Demon (disambiguation), a name used for various automobiles made by Dodge

== See also ==
- Daimon (disambiguation)
- The Demons (disambiguation)
- Demon (comics)
- Demonic (disambiguation)
- Devil (disambiguation)
