= Daimon (disambiguation) =

A daimon is a lesser deity or guiding spirit in ancient Greek religion and mythology.

Daimon may also refer to:

- Daimon (Head Chief) (c. 1850–1930), Nauruan politician
- Daimon (name), a Japanese name
- Daimon, Toyama, a Japanese town

== See also ==
- Daimonic, a religious, psychological, philosophical, and literary concept
- Daimon Station
- Demon (disambiguation)
