= Ladder match =

Professional wrestling match type

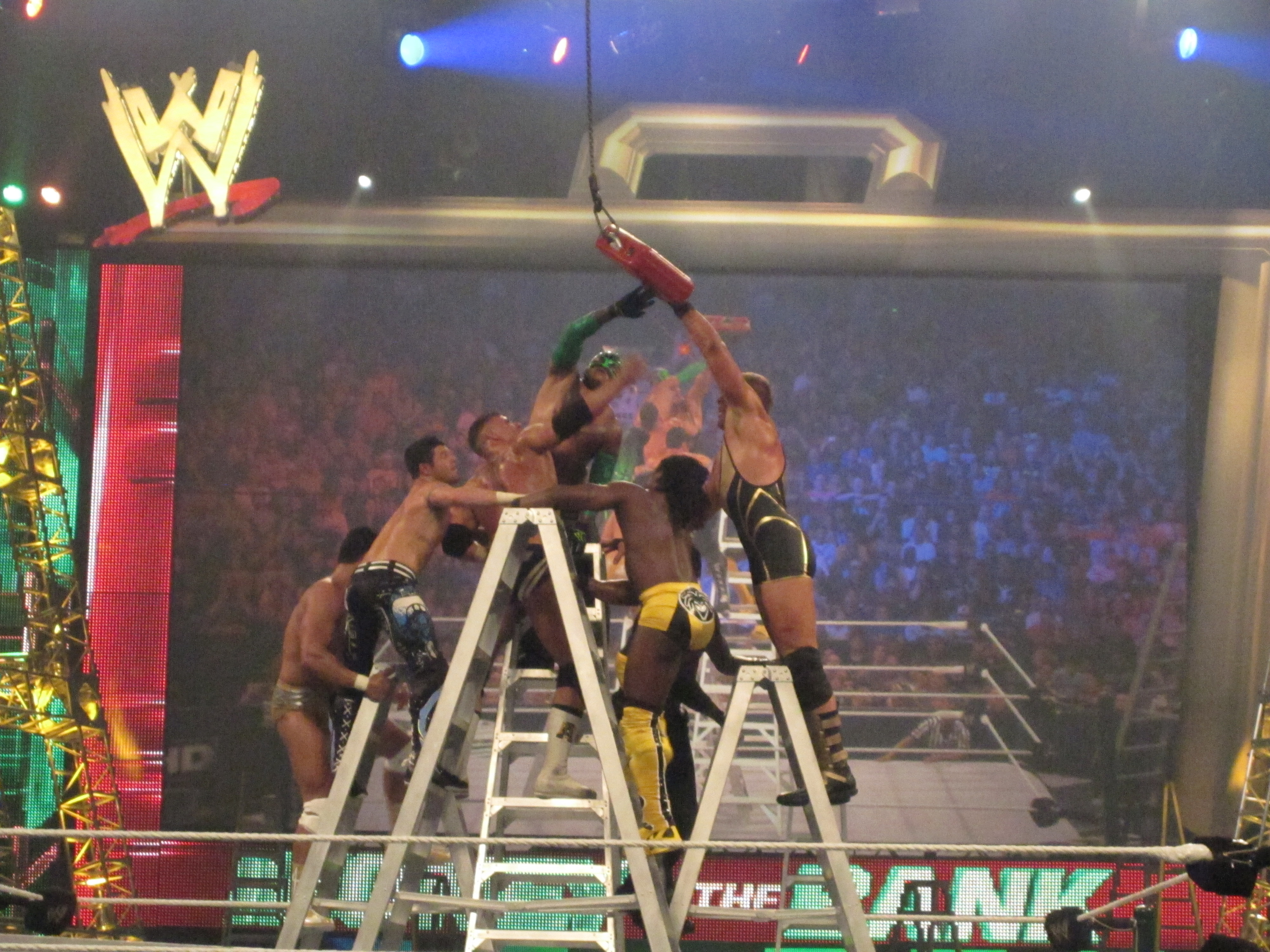
The Raw Money in the Bank ladder match at Money in the Bank (2011).

A ladder match is a type of match in professional wrestling, most commonly one in which an item (usually a title belt) is hung above the ring, and the winner is the contestant who climbs a ladder and retrieves the item. The ladder itself becomes a key feature of the match, as wrestlers will use the ladder as a weapon to strike the opponent(s), as a launching pad for acrobatic attacks, and frequently these matches include impressive falls from the top of the ladder. There have been a few matches in which the hung item must be used in a special manner in order to win the match, such as striking the opponent with the item (see Bam Bam Bigelow vs. Scott Hall taser match, where one must strike the opponent with the taser, regardless of who retrieved the taser first).

Ladder matches are often used as a finale to storylines and it is more common to have symbolic briefcases (usually "containing" a contract for a future championship match) or championship belts hung above the ring. Ladder matches and their variants (such as TLC matches and Full Metal Mayhem) are often used in feuds that involve a dispute over possession of an item (such as a stolen title belt or the "paperwork" for the contractual services of a manager). Ladder matches are almost always fought under no disqualification rules.

Ladder matches are perceived as having greater level of realism than other types of wrestling performances, with some scholars arguing that the use of ladders serves to buttress the performances underlying themes of achievable masculinity.

== History ==
The ladder match could have been invented by either Dan Kroffat of the Stampede Wrestling organization from Calgary, Alberta, Canada or British wrestler Kendo Nagasaki. In September 1972, Stampede Wrestling held the first ever ladder match between Dan Kroffat and Tor Kamata, where the object to be grabbed was a wad of money. In a match aired in 1987 but recorded in December 1986, Kendo Nagasaki competed in a "disco challenge" ladder match against Clive Myers on the popular World of Sport. The aim of this match was to retrieve a gold coloured disco record suspended above the ring.

In July 1983, Stampede Wrestling held a ladder match in which Bret Hart faced off against Bad News Allen. Hart went on to join the World Wrestling Federation in 1984, and, in the early 1990s, suggested this type of match to promoter Vince McMahon, years before the gimmick achieved its eventual popularity.

The first ever ladder match in the WWF, in which Hart defeated Shawn Michaels to retain the WWF Intercontinental Title, was held in Portland, ME on July 21, 1992. The match was taped for Coliseum Video and included on the 1993 VHS release Smack 'Em Whack 'Em, but never aired on television and remained widely unseen until its inclusion on the 2007 The Ladder Match DVD and among the bonus material on the 2011 DVD and Blu-ray collection WWE's Greatest Rivalries: Shawn Michaels vs. Bret Hart. The two performers tell interviewer Jim Ross how the match was planned along with an intended ladder rematch that never materialized.

== Variants ==
- Tables, Ladders, and Chairs (TLC) match – Variation of the ladder match where numerous tables and chairs are placed around the ring as for easy access to be used as additional weapons (and their use is encouraged).
- Money in the Bank ladder match – Exclusively used in WWE; a ladder match where multiple competitors try to climb a ladder to obtain a briefcase, containing a contract allowing the winner to challenge one of WWE's championships at any time within the next 12 months. The match originally took place at every WrestleMania from WrestleMania 21 to WrestleMania XXVI, after which it was moved to its own annual Money in the Bank pay-per-view.

== Literary analysis ==
From the perspective of thing theory, the ladder serves as a storytelling actant, serving as a bridge between the actors and the action. Moreover, the ladder serves as the wrestlers' inanimate opponent, facilitating a "man versus machine" narrative conflict and providing a demonic structure. Such a narrative structure imbues a modicum literary realism into the performances, highlighting the underlying athleticism in the theatric performance.

Sharon Mazer, a sociologist, opines that ladder matches, such as that performed at WrestleMania X, serve to placate the castration anxiety of fans, commenting that, although wrestling is permeated with homoerotic pageantry, the use of a ladder adds realism by ensuring only one performer avoids the metaphoric emasculation of defeat.
