= David Norton =

David Norton may refer to:

- Dave Norton (football) (born 1965), footballer
- David C. Norton (born 1946), United States federal judge
- David L. Norton (1930–1995), American philosopher
- David P. Norton (1941–2023), American business theorist and management consultant
