= Domonic =

Domonic is a masculine given name. Notable people with the name include:

- Domonic Bedggood (born 1994), Australian diver
- Domonic Brown (born 1987), American baseball outfielder
- Domonic Jones (born 1981), American basketball player

== See also ==
- Dominic, masculine given name
- Demonic (disambiguation)
