= Demonic =

Demonic, daemonic or dæmonic may refer to:

- Demon, a malevolent supernatural entity
- Daemon, a lesser deity or guiding spirit in ancient Greek religion and mythology
- Demonic (album), a 1997 album by Testament
- Demonic (2015 film), an American supernatural horror film
- Demonic (2021 film), a Canadian-American science fiction supernatural horror film
- Daemonic (novel), a 1995 novel by Stephen Laws
- Johannes Roberts' Demonic, the American title of the 2005 British horror film Forest of the Damned

== See also ==
- Daimonic, a religious, psychological, philosophical, and literary concept
- Demon (disambiguation)
