= David L. Norton =

American philosopher

David Lloyd Norton
- Born: March 27, 1930; St. Louis, Missouri, United States
- Died: July 24, 1995 (aged 65)

Education
- Education: Washington University in St. Louis; Boston University

Philosophical work
- Era: 20th-century philosophy
- Region: Western philosophy

David Lloyd Norton (March 27, 1930 – July 24, 1995) was an American philosopher. He was born in St. Louis, Missouri, March 27, 1930, to Cecil V. Norton and (Adelene) Ruth Essick Norton. He was the brother of Douglas C. Norton (born 1945) of Norton's Fine Art in St. Louis.

== Studies, family and early career ==
Norton earned a bachelor's degree in Civil Engineering from the McKelvey School of Engineering in 1952. In 1953 he married Joan Marie Carter of Webster Groves, Missouri, and in 1954 their first child, Anita Lee Norton (later Kronsberg) was born. During these years Norton also served as Associate Leader of the St. Louis Ethical Society. He and his wife lost an infant daughter, Nancy Ann, to crib death (or sudden infant death syndrome) in 1959. In 1961 Norton and his wife adopted an infant son, whom they named Ronald Vallet Norton.

After working as a civil engineer in California, Norton returned to Washington University in St. Louis to study philosophy, earning a master's degree in 1962. He then took up doctoral work at Boston University, earning his Ph.D. in 1968. While in Boston, Norton served as Leader of the Boston Ethical Society. His second son, Peter, was born in Boston in 1963. His dissertation was "Transcendental Imagination: A Post-Kantian Appraisal."

In 1966 Norton moved with his family to Newark, Delaware, to serve on the faculty of the University of Delaware's philosophy department. Shortly thereafter he divorced and remarried. He fathered two more sons, Tucker (b. 1971) and Cory (b. 1976).

== Philosophy ==
Norton taught at the University of Delaware for 29 years. In 1976 Princeton University Press published his book Personal Destinies: A Philosophy of Ethical Individualism, which received wide notice. His next book, Democracy and Moral Development, was published by the University of California Press in 1991. In 1995 Norton succumbed quickly to cancer, dying July 24. His final book, Imagination, Understanding, and the Virtue of Liberality, published by Rowman and Littlefield, appeared soon after.

In the last of the works listed above, Norton summarized his three books' related purposes. In Personal Destinies, he "addressed the fundamental moral question, What is a worthy life for a human being?" In Democracy and Moral Development, he took up "the inescapable correlative, What is a good society?" Finally, in Imagination, Understanding, and the Virtue of Liberality, Norton asked "what kind of world can productively accommodate a plurality of good societies?" and identified the traits of character required of individuals who would promote it.

As an academic philosopher, Norton devoted attention to the fundamental and practical problems of the life well lived. For his inspiration Norton turned chiefly to the Greeks, and especially to the dialogues of Plato. He called himself an ethical individualist, seeing a harmony between the individual's fidelity to his own "personal destiny" and the fulfillment of society's collective needs. He held that within each person is an innate potentiality (his daimon, or soul), and that each person's life task is to discover it and actualize it. This conviction shaped Norton's views on the distinct purposes of each of life's stages, on the proper roles of parents and schools, and on the best social and political arrangements.

In a late essay, Norton put his philosophy in succinct terms: "There is a distinctive course of life that is right for each individual, amid countless possibilities. This is the individual's vocation, variously termed his or her 'genius,' 'daimon,' 'Buddha nature,' or 'atman.' It consists in innate potentialities that predispose persons to a particular direction in life. As distinguished from other possibilities, the actualization by an individual of his or her potentialities affords intrinsic rewards to that person—that is, the activity is personally fulfilling and satisfying. Self-knowledge, then, is knowledge of the activities, situations, and relationships that the individual experiences as intrinsically rewarding. Engaged at these, the individual invests the best of himself or herself and strives continuously to improve, while in the process contributing objective values to others." ["Education for Self-Knowledge and Worthy Living," in Howie and Schedler, eds., Ethical Issues in Contemporary Society (Southern Illinois University Press, 1995)].

Norton's own philosophy recognized "duplicity" as a "hallmark of human nature," and saw in it the ultimate threat to the life well lived (Personal Destinies, ch. 1). The epigraph to Personal Destinies' is an appeal from Socrates to unite "the outward and inward man." As Norton wrote in 1976, "Philosophy will sometimes present an individual with features of his acts and principles that horrify him, producing in him an exchange of principles and patterns of behavior" (Personal Destinies, "Unscholarly Epilogue").

== Quotations ==
• "In pre-Hellenic Greece, sculptors made busts of the semi-deity Silenus that had a trick to them. Inside the hollow clay likeness was hidden a golden figurine, to be revealed when the bust was broken open. ... Each person is a bust of Silenus containing a golden figurine, his daimon. The person's daimon is an ideal of perfection—unique, individual, and self-identical. It is neither the actual person nor a product of the actual person, yet it is fully real, affording to the actual person his supreme aim and establishing the principle by which the actual person can grow in identity, worth, and being." —Personal Destinies, ch. 1.

• "From the humanistic standpoint a philosophy that seeks converts is a contradiction in terms. The function of humanistic philosophy is not to impose invented forms upon human life, but to elicit and clarify the forms the lives of persons implicitly possess." —Personal Destinies, "Unscholarly Epilogue."

• "Those who accepted classical liberalism's invitation also incurred great costs, for with it they accepted an economistic conception of self and society that has by its moral minimalism rendered invisible the large demands and rewards of worthy living." —Democracy and Moral Development, ch. 7.

• Autonomy is not "total self-sufficiency" but "the entitlement of each interactive entity to determine for itself what its contributions to others will be and, likewise, to determine for itself what use it will make of the self-determined contributions of other entities." —Imagination, Understanding, and the Virtue of Liberality, ch. 4.

== Bibliography ==
Books

Imagination, Understanding, and the Virtue of Liberality (Rowman & Littlefield, 1996).

Democracy and Moral Development (University of California Press, 1991).

Personal Destinies: A Philosophy of Ethical Individualism (Princeton University Press, 1976).

Japanese Buddhism and the American Renaissance (in English and Japanese editions; Tokyo: Institute of Oriental Philosophy, 1993).

Articles and Book Chapters

“Moral Integrity, Organizational Management, and Public Education,” International Journal of Public Administration 17, no. 12, pp. 2259–2284.

“Education for Self-Knowledge and Worthy Living,” in John Howie and George Schedler, eds. Ethical Issues in Contemporary Society (Carbondale: Southern Illinois University Press, 1994), ch. 6.

“Education for Moral Integrity,” in Dayle M. Bethel, ed., Compulsory Schooling and Human Learning: The Moral Failure of Public Education in America and Japan (San Francisco: Caddo Gap Press, 1994), ch. 1.

“Parents as Learning Enablers,” in Bethel, Compulsory Schooling, ch. 6.

“On Recovering the Telos in Teleology, or ‘Where’s the Beef?’” The Monist 75, no. 1 (January 1992), 3-13.

“Humanistic Education for World Citizenship,” in Osamu Akimoto, ed., The Way Toward Humanistic Education (Tokyo: Daisan Press, 1992), 169–200.

“Moral Education for Values Creation,” in Osamu Akimoto, ed., The Way Toward Humanistic Education (Tokyo: Daisan Press, 1992), 202–230.

“Education for Values Creation,” Soka Gakkai News (Tokyo) 11, no. 259 (September. 1990), 14–22.

“Makiguchi: A Philosophical Appraisal,” in Dayle M. Bethel, ed., Education for Creative Living: Ideas and Proposals of Tsunesaburo Makiguchi (Iowa State University Press, 1989), 203–214.

“Moral Minimalism and the Development of Moral Character,” in Peter A. French, et al., eds., Midwest Studies in Philosophy, vol. 13: “Ethical Theory: Character and Virtue” (Notre Dame University Press, 1988), 180–195.

“The New Moral Philosophy and Its Application to Organizational Life,” in N. Dale Wright ed., Papers on the Ethics of Administration (State University of New York Press, 1988), 47–66.

“Social Organization and Individual Initiative: A Eudaimonist Model,” in Konstantin Kolenda, ed., Organizations and Ethical Individualism (Praeger, 1988), 107–136.

“Liberty, Virtue, and Self-Development: A Eudaimonist Perspective,” Reason Papers 12 (1987), 3–15.

“Tradition and Autonomous Individuality,” Journal of Value Inquiry 21 (1987), 131–146.

“The Moral Individualism of Henry David Thoreau,” in Marcus G. Singer, ed., American Philosophy (Cambridge University Press, 1986), 239–253.

“Is ‘Flourishing’ a True Alternative Ethics?,” Reason Papers no. 10 (spring 1985), 101-105.

“Life-Shaping Choices,” The Humanist, Sept.-Oct. 1983, 41–42.

“Good Government, Justice, and Self-Fulfilling Individuality,” in Roger Skurski, ed., New Directions in Economic Justice (Notre Dame University Press, 1983), 33–52.

“Nature and Personal Destiny: A Turning Point in the Enterprise of Self-Responsibility,” in A. T. Tymieniecka, ed. The Philosophical Reflection of Man in Literature (Reidel, 1982), 173–184.

“Toward the Community of True Individuals,” in Konstantin Kolenda, ed., Person and Community in American Thought (Rice University Press, 1981), 119–133.

“On an Internal Disparity in Universalizability-Criterion Formulations,” Review of Metaphysics 33, no. 3 (March 1980), 51–59.

“On the Tension Between Equality and Excellence in the Ideal of Democracy,” in Maurice Wohlgelernter, ed., History, Religion, and Spiritual Democracy: Essays in Honor of Joseph L. Blau (Columbia University Press, 1980).

“On the Concrete Origin of Metaphysical Questions in Childhood,” in Matthew Lippman and Ann Margaret Sharp, eds., Growing Up with Philosophy (Temple University Press, 1978), 121–130.

“Can Fanaticism Be Distinguished from Moral Idealism?” Review of Metaphysics 30, no. 3 (March 1977), 497–507.

“Individualism and Productive Justice," Ethics 87, no. 2 (January 1977), 113–125.

“Rawls’ Theory of Justice: A Perfectionist Rejoinder,” Ethics 85, no. 1 (October 1974), 50-57.

“On Teaching Students What They Already Know,” School Review (Chicago University Press) 82 no. 1 (November 1973), 45–56.

“Social Entailments of Self-Actualization” (co-author), Journal of Value Inquiry 7 no. 2 (summer 1973), 106–120.

“Eudaimonia and the Pain-Displeasure Contingency Argument” Ethics 82, no. 3 (spring 1972), 314–320.

“From Law to Love: Social Order as Self-Actualization,” Journal of Value Inquiry 6, no. 1 (spring 1972), 91–101.

“Does God Have a Ph.D.?” School Review 80, no. 1 (November 1971), 67–75.

“Toward an Epistemology of Romantic Love,” Centennial Review 14, no. 4 (fall 1970), 421–443.

“The Rites of Passage from Dependence to Autonomy,” School Review 79, no. 1 (November 1970), 19–41.

“Learning, Life-Style, and Imagination,” School Review 78, no. 1 (November 1969), 63–79.

“Daimons and Human Destiny,” Centennial Review 13, no. 2 (spring 1969), 154–165.

“Philosophy and Imagination,” Centennial Review 12, no. 4 (fall 1968), 392–413.

“Art as Shock and Re-Beginning,” Centennial Review 12, no. l (winter 1968), 96–109.

“Life, Death, and Moral Autonomy,” Centennial Review 10 no. 1 (winter 1966), 1–12.

“Humanism as a Culture,” The Humanist, no. 6 (1963), 180–184.

“The Elders of Our Tribe,” The Nation, February 18, 1961.

“Return to the Hearth’s Longing,” The Nation, August 20, 1960.

“New Ear for Emerson,” The Nation, March 12, 1960.

== See also ==
- American philosophy
- Ethical egoism
- List of American philosophers
