= From Her Eyes =

Welsh metalcore band

- Origin: Bridgend, UK
- Genres: metalcore, hardcore punk, post-hardcore
- Years active: 2012–2016
- Labels: Independent
- Members: Gary Holley; James Kearle; Tomas Morgan; Jesse Simmonds
- Past members: Indigo Lani Lewis-Jones; Luke Williams; Joe Shutt
- Website: https://www.facebook.com

From Her Eyes was a metalcore band formed in Bridgend, Wales. The band formed in May 2012, and disbanded in February 2016.

== History ==
After originating from various local bands, the group was constructed by Tomas Morgan, James Kearle and ex-bassist Luke Williams in June 2012. The band recruited Indigo Lani Lewis-Jones and Gary Holley to add much needed talent to the line-up.

From Her Eyes quickly gained a small following in the local area, and dedicated more time into the project. From Her Eyes released a demo EP entitled No Place Like Home in late June 2013. After the release, Luke Williams subsequently announced his departure from From Her Eyes in mid-July. Luke was replaced later with Jesse Simmonds,

In the following months, From Her Eyes continued to perform regularly whilst beginning to write new material. Demos for the tracks "Comatose" and "Disillusionist" (which would both feature on the band's EP Demons) were completed in late 2013. Indigo Lani Lewis-Jones left the band in January 2014 due to creative differences.

Upon her release, From Her Eyes recruited Joe Shutt. The band recorded the Demons EP with Jonny Renshaw (Devil Sold His Soul) at Bandit Studios (Devil Sold His Soul, The Elijah, Blood Youth) in April 2014.

The EP was subsequently released on 25 August 2014. On the back of this EP, From Her Eyes subsequently supported Bury Tomorrow, Polar, Monuments, No Consequence, Continents and more and then proceeded to record a new single. "Glass" was released on 21 September 2015.

The band embarked on a UK tour with Novelists from October–November 2015.

On 25 February From Her Eyes announced they would be disbanding. They stated that the departure was amicable, thanking fans and the Welsh Scene.

== Band members ==
=== Final lineup ===
- Tomas Morgan - lead vocals (2012–2016)
- James Kearle - guitar (2012–2016),
- Jesse Simmonds - bass (2013–2016)
- Gary Holley - drums (2012–2016)

=== Previous members ===
- Luke Williams - bass, clean vocals (2012–2013)
- Indigo Lani Lewis-Jones - guitar, clean vocals (2012–2014)
- Joe Shutt - guitar (2014–2015)

== Discography ==
=== Singles ===
- Glass - 2015

=== EP ===
- Demons (EP) - 2014
