= Stephen Laws (author) =

British author

Stephen Laws (born July 13, 1952) is an English author working mostly in the genres of horror and dark fantasy. Married, with three children, he lives in his birthplace of Newcastle upon Tyne and makes frequent use of local settings in his published works. A writer of novels and short stories, he is also an occasional reviewer, columnist, and film festival interviewer. His story The Song My Sister Sang won the British Fantasy Award for short fiction in 1999 and he served as a judge for the World Fantasy Awards in 2013.

== Early life ==
Asthmatic as a child and often bedridden in the winter months, Laws read and created stories as a means of escape. An early fascination with genre is attributed to his father's dramatic re-telling of the plots of X-rated horror movies fresh in his mind from the evening before. Laws would later perform a similar 'playground storyteller' service for school friends, recounting and sometimes embellishing the narratives of Hammer Horror films seen in local cinemas in youthful defiance of age restrictions

== Career ==
Stephen Laws left Manor Park Technical School at 16 to work in the Architects Department of Northumberland County Council, studying for professional qualifications in the evenings. He went on to work in local government as a committee administrator for twenty years, publishing his first novel in 1985 and becoming a full-time writer in 1992. Early influences included Nigel Kneale's TV dramas and shows such as The Twilight Zone, The Outer Limits, and Doctor Who, with creative inspiration drawn from the writing of Richard Matheson.

Success in local writing competitions, along with frustration over a cancelled BBC drama commission, led to the writing of his debut novel Ghost Train, first published in 1985 by Souvenir Press. This conscious effort to create a modern ghost story was widely seen as a successful move to breathe new life into a well-established genre. More novels and short fiction would follow, along with occasional reviews and magazine columns.

Described as "a steady, reliable writer whose best work is highly original and carries a powerful emotional impact", Laws serves as an occasional onstage interviewer of guests and personalities at film festivals, and contributes introductions and critical matter to DVD and Blu-ray releases of classic genre material. He adapted and appears in a short film adaptation of his short story The Secret

A book-length study of his writing, The Laws of Horror: An Exploration of the Novels of Stephen Laws by Anthony Watson was published by Witness Books in 2025

== Bibliography ==
=== Novels ===
- Ghost Train, Souvenir Press 1985
- Spectre, Souvenir Press 1986
- The Wyrm, Souvenir Press 1987
- The Frighteners, Souvenir Press 1990
- Darkfall, New English Library 1992
- Gideon, New English Library 1993
- Macabre, Hodder & Stoughton 1994
- Daemonic, Hodder & Stoughton 1995
- Somewhere South of Midnight, Hodder & Stoughton 1996
- Chasm, Hodder & Stoughton 1998
- Ferocity, Leisure Books/Dorchester Publishing 2007

=== Chapbook ===
- Annabel Says, with Simon Clark, The British Fantasy Society 1995

=== Collections ===
- The Midnight Man, Silver Salamander Press 2000

=== Stories ===
- Ghost Train (extract) (1986)
- Guilty Party (1988)
- Junk (1989)
- The Secret (1989)
- The Frighteners (excerpt) (1990)
- He Who Laughs (1991)
- Gordy's A-Okay (1991)
- Bleeding Dry (1992)
- Pot Luck (1993)
- Deep Blue (1994)
- The Fractured Man (1995)
- Man Beast (1995)
- Black Cab (1995)
- Yesterday I Flew with the Birds (1995)
- Annabelle Says (1995) with Simon Clark
- The Crawl (1997)
- The Song My Sister Sang (1998)
- The Penitent (1999)
- Outrage (2005)
- The Causeway (2006)
- Stolen Blood (2011)
- Harbinger (2013)
- The Slista (2014)
- The End of the Pier (2015)
- The Swan Dive (2017)
- The Greek Widow (2018)
- Dead Man's Hand (2018)
- The Laundromat (2018)
- Get Worse Soon (2018)
- The True Colour of Blood (2022)

== Adaptations ==
- The Secret Hydra-X Films 2012
