= The Demons =

The Demons may refer to:

- Demons (Dostoevsky novel), an 1872 novel by Russian Fyodor Dostoevsky, also translated The Demons
- The Demons ( novel), a 1956 novel by Heimito von Doderer
- The Demons (1973 film), a French-Portuguese horror film directed by Jesús Franco
- The Demons, also known as The Nine Demons, a 1984 Mandarin-language Hong Kong film directed by Chang Cheh
- The Demons (2015 film), a Canadian drama film directed by Philippe Lesage
- The Demons (audio drama), based on the television series Doctor Who
- The Dæmons, a Doctor Who serial first broadcast in 1971
- Melbourne Football Club, nicknamed the Demons

== See also ==
- Demon (disambiguation)
