= Dodge Demon =

Dodge Demon may refer to

- Dodge Dart Demon, a 2-door fastback coupe variant of the 1971–1972 Dodge Dart
- Dodge Demon (concept car), a 2007 concept car
- Dodge Challenger SRT Demon, a highly modified variant of the 2018 Dodge Challenger
- Dodge Challenger SRT Demon 170, a even more highly modified version of the 2023 Dodge Challenger
