= Daimon Station =

Daimon Station (大門駅, Daimon-eki) may refer to multiple railway stations in Japan:

- Daimon Station (Aichi) on the Aichi Loop Line
- Daimon Station (Hiroshima) on the Sanyō Main Line
- Daimon Station (Tokyo) on the Toei Asakusa Line and the Toei Ōedo Line
