= List of Yu-Gi-Oh! GX episodes =

This is a complete list of episodes for the Japanese anime series Yu-Gi-Oh! Duel Monsters GX (changed to simply Yu-Gi-Oh! GX in the 4Kids dub, due to the previous anime not using "Duel Monsters" in the title), based on the Yu-Gi-Oh! Duel Monsters anime.

There are four different music themes set accompanying the opening animation and ending credits. For episodes 1-33, they are Rising Weather Hallelujah for the opening animation and Genkai Battle for the ending credits. From episode 34 through to episode 104 they are 99% and WAKE UP YOUR HEART respectively, episodes 105-156 contained Teardrop and The Sun, and for the final episodes, 157 to 180, they were Precious Time, Glory Days and Endless Dream. When dubbed into English they were all replaced by the same song, Get Your Game On!!, by 4Kids Entertainment. The final episode of the third season, as well as the entire fourth season, were not dubbed into English by 4Kids, due to the pressure to begin airing Yu-Gi-Oh! 5D's before the end of 2008.

== Series overview ==
| Season | Episodes | Originally released | |
| Season | Episodes | First released | Last released |
|---|---|---|---|
| 1 | 52 | October 6, 2004 | September 28, 2005 |
| 2 | 52 | October 5, 2005 | September 27, 2006 |
| 3 | 52 | October 4, 2006 | October 10, 2007 |
| 4 | 24 | October 17, 2007 | March 26, 2008 |

== Episode list ==
=== Season 1: Seven Stars Saga (2004–05) ===
| No. overall | No. in season | English dub title / Japanese translated title | Written by | Original release date | American air date |
|---|---|---|---|---|---|
| 1 | 1 | "The Next King of Games" / "The One Who Inherits the Game"; Transliteration: "Yūgi o Tsugumono" (Japanese: 遊戯を継ぐ者) | Junki Takegami | October 6, 2004 | October 10, 2005 |
| 2 | 2 | "Welcome to Duel Academy" / "Flame Wingman"; Transliteration: "Fureimu Winguman" (Japanese: フレイム·ウィングマン) | Junki Takegami | October 10, 2004 | October 11, 2005 |
| 3 | 3 | "A Duel in Love" / "Etoile Cyber"; Transliteration: "Etowāru Saibā" (Japanese: エトワール·サイバー) | Atsushi Maekawa | October 20, 2004 | October 12, 2005 |
| 4 | 4 | "Making The Grade/Raring to Go" / "5 Polymers! VWXYZ"; Transliteration: "Go Jūgattai! Vi to Zi" (Japanese: 5重合体! VWXYZ) | Yasuyuki Suzuki | October 27, 2004 | October 13, 2005 |
| 5 | 5 | "The Shadow Duelist (Part 1 of 2)" / "A Dark Demon Deck"; Transliteration: "Yami no Dēmon Dekki" (Japanese: 闇のデーモンデッキ) | Shin Yoshida | November 3, 2004 | October 17, 2005 |
| 6 | 6 | "The Shadow Duelist (Part 2 of 2)" / "The Miracle of Winged Kuriboh"; Transliteration: "Hane Kuribō no Kiseki" (Japanese: ハネクリボーの奇跡) | Shin Yoshida | November 10, 2004 | October 18, 2005 |
| 7 | 7 | "Duel and Unusual Punishment" / "Sho's Vehicle Deck"; Transliteration: "Shō no Bīkuroido Dekki" (Japanese: 翔の乗り物デッキ) | Junki Takegami | November 17, 2004 | October 19, 2005 |
| 8 | 8 | "For the Sake of Syrus" / "Strongest! Cyber End Dragon"; Transliteration: "Saikyō! Saibā Endo Doragon" (Japanese: 最強! サイバーエンド·ドラゴン) | Yasuyuki Suzuki | November 24, 2004 | October 20, 2005 |
| 9 | 9 | "Family Business" / "One Blow Certain Kill! Flipping the Table"; Transliteration: "Ichigeki Hissai! Chabudai Gaeshi" (Japanese: 一撃必殺! ちゃぶ台返し) | Atsushi Maekawa | December 1, 2004 | October 21, 2005 |
| 10 | 10 | "Tag Team Trial (Part 1 of 2)" / "Judai & Sho! Tag Duel (Part 1 of 2)"; Transliteration: "Jūdai to Shō! Taggu Dyueru (Zenpen)" (Japanese: 十代&翔! タッグデュエル (前編)) | Akemi Omode | December 7, 2004 | October 24, 2005 |
| 11 | 11 | "Tag Team Trial (Part 2 of 2)" / "Judai & Sho! Tag Duel (Part 2 of 2)"; Transliteration: "Jūdai to Shō! Taggu Dyueru (Kōhen)" (Japanese: 十代&翔! タッグデュエル (後編)) | Akemi Omode | December 14, 2004 | October 25, 2005 |
| 12 | 12 | "Formula for Success" / "Oxygen + Hydrogen = H²O Dragon"; Transliteration: "Sanso Purasu Suiso Ikōru Wōtā Doragon" (Japanese: 酸素+水素=H²Oドラゴン) | Shin Yoshida | December 22, 2004 | October 26, 2005 |
| 13 | 13 | "Monkey See, Monkey Duel" / "Wild Release! SAL Duel!"; Transliteration: "Yasei Kaihō! Saru Dyueru" (Japanese: 野性解放! SALデュエル) | Atsushi Maekawa | December 29, 2004 | October 27, 2005 |
| 14 | 14 | "A Spirit Summoned" / "Vs. Psycho Shocker!?"; Transliteration: "Vāsasu Saiko Shokkā!?" (Japanese: VS サイコショッカー!?) | Yasuyuki Suzuki | January 5, 2005 | October 28, 2005 |
| 15 | 15 | "Courting Alexis" / "Duel Tennis of Youth"; Transliteration: "Seishun no Dyueru Tenisu" (Japanese: 青春のデュエルテニス) | Atsushi Maekawa | January 12, 2005 | November 14, 2005 |
| 16 | 16 | "The Duel Giant" / "King Goblin of the Dark Night"; Transliteration: "Yamiyo no Kingu Goburin" (Japanese: 闇夜のキングゴブリン) | Akemi Omode | January 19, 2005 | November 15, 2005 |
| 17 | 17 | "Nature of the Draw" / "Draw! Draw! Draw!"; Transliteration: "Dorō! Dorō! Dorō!" (Japanese: ドロー!ドロー!ドロー!) | Yasuyuki Suzuki | January 26, 2005 | November 16, 2005 |
| 18 | 18 | "The King of the Copycats (Part 1 of 2)" / "Vs. Yugi's Deck (Part 1 of 2)"; Transliteration: "Vāsasu Yūgi Dekki (Zenpen)" (Japanese: VS 遊戯デッキ (前編)) | Shin Yoshida | February 2, 2005 | November 17, 2005 |
| 19 | 19 | "The King of the Copycats (Part 2 of 2)" / "Vs. Yugi's Deck (Part 2 of 2)"; Transliteration: "Vāsasu Yūgi Dekki (Kōhen)" (Japanese: VS 遊戯デッキ (後編)) | Shin Yoshida | February 9, 2005 | November 18, 2005 |
| 20 | 20 | "The Maiden in Love" / "The Strong Deck with the Maiden in Love!"; Transliteration: "Koisuru Otome wa Tsuyoi no yo Dekki!" (Japanese: 恋する乙女は強いのよデッキ!) | Junki Takegami | February 16, 2005 | November 21, 2005 |
| 21 | 21 | "The Duel Off (Part 1 of 2)" / "Fusion Seal! Judai vs. Misawa (Part 1 of 2)"; Transliteration: "Yūgō Fūji! Jūdai Vāsasu Misawa (Zenpen)" (Japanese: 融合封じ! 十代VS三沢(前編)) | Akemi Omode | February 23, 2005 | November 22, 2005 |
| 22 | 22 | "The Duel Off (Part 2 of 2)" / "Summon Wildman! Judai vs. Misawa (Part 2 of 2)"; Transliteration: "Wairudoman Shōkan! Jūdai Vāsasu Misawa (Kōhen)" (Japanese: ワイルドマン召喚! 十代VS三沢(後編)) | Akemi Omode | March 2, 2005 | November 22, 2005 |
| 23 | 23 | "The Little Belowski" / "Exhaustion! Moke Moke Duel"; Transliteration: "Datsuryoku! Moke Moke Dyueru" (Japanese: 脱力! もけもけデュエル) | Yasuyuki Suzuki | March 9, 2005 | December 8, 2005 |
| 24 | 24 | "The New Chazz" / "Revival! Manjoume Thunder"; Transliteration: "Fukkatsu! Manjōme Sandā" (Japanese: 復活! 万丈目サンダー) | Shin Yoshida | March 16, 2005 | December 9, 2005 |
| 25 | 25 | "The School Duel (Part 1 of 2)" / "Vs. Manjoume Thunder (Part 1 of 2) - Threat of Armed Dragon " Transliteration: "Vāsasu Manjōme Sandā (Zenpen) Āmudo Doragon no Kyōi" (Japanese: VS万丈目サンダー(前編) アームドドラゴンの脅威) | Shin Yoshida | March 23, 2005 | December 12, 2005 |
| 26 | 26 | "The School Duel (Part 2 of 2)" / "Vs. Manjoume Thunder (Part 2 of 2) - Armed Dragon LV7"; Transliteration: "Vāsasu Manjōme Sandā (Kōhen) Āmudo Doragon Reberu Sebun" (Japanese: VS万丈目サンダー(後編) アームドドラゴンLV7) | Shin Yoshida | March 30, 2005 | December 13, 2005 |
| 27 | 27 | "Grave Risk (Part 1 of 2)" / "The Extracurricular Class is a Dark Duel?! (Part 1 of 2)"; Transliteration: "Kagaijugyō wa Yami no Dyueru!? (Zenpen)" (Japanese: 課外授業は闇のデュエル!?(前編)) | Junki Takegami | April 6, 2005 | December 14, 2005 |
| 28 | 28 | "Grave Risk (Part 2 of 2)" / "The Extracurricular Class is a Dark Duel?! (Part 2 of 2)"; Transliteration: "Kagaijugyō wa Yami no Dyueru!? (Kōhen)" (Japanese: 課外授業は闇のデュエル!?(後編)) | Junki Takegami | April 13, 2005 | December 15, 2005 |
| 29 | 29 | "Doomsday Duel (Part 1 of 2)" / "Vs. Darkness (Part 1 of 2) - Challenge of the Red Eyes Black Dragon"; Transliteration: "Vāsasu Dākunesu (Zenpen) Reddo Aizu Burakku Doragon no Chōsen" (Japanese: VS ダークネス(前編)真紅眼の黒竜の挑戦) | Yasuyuki Suzuki | April 20, 2005 | January 30, 2006 |
| 30 | 30 | "Doomsday Duel (Part 2 of 2)" / "Vs. Darkness (Part 2 of 2) - Attack of the Red Eyes Darkness Dragon"; Transliteration: "Vāsasu Dākunesu (Kōhen) Reddo Aizu Dākunesu Doragon no Kōgeki" (Japanese: VS ダークネス(後編)真紅眼の闇竜の攻撃) | Yasuyuki Suzuki | April 27, 2005 | January 31, 2006 |
| 31 | 31 | "Field of Screams (Part 1 of 3)" / "Cronos vs. Vampire Camula"; Transliteration: "Kuronosu Vāsasu Vanpaia Kamyūra" (Japanese: クロノスVS吸血美女カミューラ) | Natsuko Takahashi | May 4, 2005 | February 1, 2006 |
| 32 | 32 | "Field of Screams (Part 2 of 3)" / "Kaiser vs. Camula - The Phantom Gate Activates!"; Transliteration: "Kaizā Vāsasu Kamyūra Genma no Tobira Hatsudō!" (Japanese: カイザーVSカミューラ 幻魔の扉発動!) | Yuki Enatsu | May 11, 2005 | February 2, 2006 |
| 33 | 33 | "Field of Screams (Part 3 of 3)" / "Shine! Shining Flare Wingman"; Transliteration: "Kagayake! Shainingu Furea Winguman" (Japanese: 輝け!シャイニング·フレア·ウィングマン) | Junki Takegami | May 18, 2005 | February 3, 2006 |
| 34 | 34 | "The Fear Factor" / "Hot Springs Sentiments! Blue Eyes White Dragon"; Transliteration: "Yukemuri Ryojō! Burū Aizu Howaito Doragon" (Japanese: 湯けむり旅情! 青眼の白龍) | Yuki Enatsu | May 25, 2005 | February 6, 2006 |
| 35 | 35 | "Sibling Rivalry" / "Union of Brothers! Ojama Delta Hurricane"; Transliteration: "Kyōdai no Kessoku! Ojama Deruta Harikēn" (Japanese: 兄弟の結束! おジャマデルタハリケーン) | Shin Yoshida | June 1, 2005 | February 7, 2006 |
| 36 | 36 | "Duel Distractions (Part 1 of 2)" / "Misawa vs. Amazoness! Marrying for a Son-in-Law Duel"; Transliteration: "Misawa-chi Vāsasu Amazonesu Mukotori Dyueru" (Japanese: 三沢っちVSアマゾネス! ムコとり決闘) | Yasuyuki Suzuki | June 8, 2005 | February 8, 2006 |
| 37 | 37 | "Duel Distractions (Part 2 of 2)" / "Human Bullet Duel! Amazoness Death Ring"; Transliteration: "Nikudan Dyueru! Amazonesu no Desu Ringu" (Japanese: 肉弾決闘! アマゾネスのデスリング) | Natsuko Takahashi | June 15, 2005 | February 9, 2006 |
| 38 | 38 | "Get Yarr Game On!" / "Underwater Duel! The Legendary City Atlantis"; Transliteration: "Suichū Dyueru! Densetsu no Miyako Atorantisu" (Japanese: 水中デュエル! 伝説の都アトランティス) | Atsushi Maekawa | June 22, 2005 | February 10, 2006 |
| 39 | 39 | "The Dark Scorpions" / "Detective Thunder vs. The Black Scorpion Grave Robber Organization"; Transliteration: "Meitantei Sandā Vāsasu Kurosasori Tōkutsu-dan" (Japanese: 名探偵サンダーVS黒サソリ盗掘団) | Shin Yoshida | June 29, 2005 | February 27, 2006 |
| 40 | 40 | "A Lying Legend" / "H-E-R-O Flash!"; Transliteration: "Eichi-Ī-Aru-Ō Furasshu!" (Japanese: H·E·R·Oフラッシュ!) | Yuki Enatsu | July 6, 2005 | February 28, 2006 |
| 41 | 41 | "A Reason to Win" / "The Dark Arena Activates! Asuka vs. Titan"; Transliteration: "Dāku Arīna Hatsudō! Asuka Vāsasu Taitan" (Japanese: 闇の闘牛場発動! 明日香VSタイタン) | Junki Takegami | July 13, 2005 | March 1, 2006 |
| 42 | 42 | "Duel Monsters Spirit Day" / "School Festival Duel! Blamagigirl Intrudes"; Transliteration: "Gakuensai Dyueru! Buramajigāru Rannyū" (Japanese: 学園祭デュエル! ブラマジガール乱入) | Natsuko Takahashi | July 20, 2005 | March 2, 2006 |
| 43 | 43 | "Hearts are Wild" / "A Second Love Chance for Asuka!?"; Transliteration: "Asuka ni Sekando Rabu Chansu!?" (Japanese: 明日香にセカンド·ラブ·チャンス!?) | Yasuyuki Suzuki | July 27, 2005 | March 3, 2006 |
| 44 | 44 | "The Seventh Shadow Rider" / "The Shadow of the Seventh"; Transliteration: "Shichininme no Kage" (Japanese: 7人目の影) | Yuki Enatsu | August 3, 2005 | March 27, 2006 |
| 45 | 45 | "Amnael's Endgame (Part 1 of 2)" / "Vs. Amnael! Absolute Seal of E-Hero"; Transliteration: "Vāsasu Amunaeru! Erementaru Hīrō Zettai Fūji" (Japanese: VSアムナエル! Eヒーロー絶対封じ) | Shin Yoshida | August 10, 2005 | March 28, 2006 |
| 46 | 46 | "Amnael's Endgame (Part 2 of 2)" / "Earth/Water/Fire/Wind Fusion! Elixirer"; Transliteration: "Tsuienfū Yūgō! Erikushīrā" (Japanese: 地水炎風融合! エリクシーラー) | Shin Yoshida | August 17, 2005 | March 29, 2006 |
| 47 | 47 | "Chazz-anova" / "Asuka vs. Manjoume! Cyber Angel -Benten-"; Transliteration: "Asuka Vāsasu Manjōme! Saibā Enjeru Benten" (Japanese: 明日香VS万丈目! サイバー·エンジェル-弁天-) | Yasuyuki Suzuki | August 24, 2005 | March 30, 2006 |
| 48 | 48 | "Rise of the Sacred Beasts (Part 1 of 2)" / "Vs. Kagemaru (Part 1 of 2) - Two Phantom Demons"; Transliteration: "Vāsasu Kagemaru (Zenpen) Futatsu no Genma" (Japanese: VS影丸(前編)2つの幻魔) | Shin Yoshida | August 31, 2005 | March 31, 2006 |
| 49 | 49 | "Rise of the Sacred Beasts (Part 2 of 2)" / "Vs. Kagemaru (Part 2 of 2) - Three Phantom Demons Awakens"; Transliteration: "Vāsasu Kagemaru (Kōhen) Sangenma Kakusei" (Japanese: VS影丸(後編)三幻魔覚醒) | Shin Yoshida | September 7, 2005 | April 3, 2006 |
| 50 | 50 | "Magna Chum Laude" / "Hayato vs. Cronos! Ayers Rock Sunrise"; Transliteration: "Hayato Vāsasu Kuronosu! Eāzu Rokku Sanraizu" (Japanese: 隼人VSクロノス!エアーズロックサンライズ) | Junki Takegami, Ema Baba | September 14, 2005 | April 4, 2006 |
| 51 | 51 | "The Graduation Match (Part 1 of 2)" / "Vs. Kaiser (Part 1 of 2) - Power Bond x Cyber End"; Transliteration: "Vāsasu Kaizā (Zenpen) Pawā Bondo ando Saibā Endo" (Japanese: VSカイザー(前編)パワー·ボンド×サイバーエンド) | Natsuko Takahashi | September 21, 2005 | April 5, 2006 |
| 52 | 52 | "The Graduation Match (Part 2 of 2)" / "Vs. Kaiser (Part 2 of 2) - Final Fusion"; Transliteration: "Vāsasu Kaizā (Kōhen) Fainaru Fyūjon" (Japanese: VSカイザー(後編)ファイナル·フュージョン) | Natsuko Takahashi | September 28, 2005 | April 6, 2006 |

=== Season 2: Society of Light Saga (2005–06) ===
| No. overall | No. in season | English dub title / Japanese translated title | Written by | Original release date | American air date |
|---|---|---|---|---|---|
| 53 | 1 | "Back to Duel" / "The Beginning of Destiny! A New Student, Edo Phoenix"; Transliteration: "Unmei no Hajimari! Shinnyūsei Edo Fenikkusu" (Japanese: 運命のはじまり!新入生エド·フェニックス) | Junki Takegami | October 5, 2005 | August 21, 2006 |
| 54 | 2 | "Champion or Chazz-been" / "Thunder vs. Elite! Mecha Ojama King Takes Off"; Transliteration: "Sandā Vāsasu Erīto-kun! Meka Ojama Kingu Hasshin" (Japanese: サンダーVSエリート君!メカおジャマキング発進) | Yoichi Kato | October 12, 2005 | August 22, 2006 |
| 55 | 3 | "A Hassleberry Hounding" / "Enter Tyranno Kenzan!"; Transliteration: "Tirano Kenzan Tōjō-zaurusu!" (Japanese: ティラノ剣山登場ざうるす!) | Yasuyuki Suzuki | October 19, 2005 | August 23, 2006 |
| 56 | 4 | "Sad but Truesdale" / "Sho vs. Insect Girl! Insect Princess"; Transliteration: "(Shō Vāsasu Konchū Shōjo! Insekuto Purinsesu" (Japanese: 翔VS昆虫少女! インセクト·プリンセス) | Yuki Enatsu | October 26, 2005 | August 24, 2006 |
| 57 | 5 | "The Demon" / "Kaiser vs. Ed! Pro League Battle"; Transliteration: "Kaizā Bāsasu Edo! Puro Rīgu no Tatakai" (Japanese: カイザーVSエド! プロリーグの戦い) | Shin Yoshida | November 2, 2005 | August 25, 2006 |
| 58 | 6 | "A New Breed of Hero (Part 1 of 2)" / "VS Edo (Part 1 of 2) - E-Hero VS E-Hero"; Transliteration: "Vāsasu Edo (Zenpen) Ī-Hīrō tai Ī-Hīrō" (Japanese: VSエド(前編)Eヒーロー対Eヒーロー) | Shin Yoshida | November 9, 2005 | August 28, 2006 |
| 59 | 7 | "A New Breed of Hero (Part 2 of 2)" / "VS Edo (Part 2 of 2) - Fated D-Hero; Transliteration: "Vāsasu Edo (Kōhen) Unmei no Dī-Hīrō" (Japanese: VSエド(後編)運命のDヒーロー) | Shin Yoshida | November 16, 2005 | August 29, 2006 |
| 60 | 8 | "Pop Goes the Duel" / "Asuka vs. Fubuki! The Path to Sibling Idol"; Transliteration: "Asuka Vāsasu Fubuki! Kyōdai Aidoru eno Michi" (Japanese: 明日香VS吹雪!兄妹アイドルへの道) | Yuki Enatsu | November 23, 2005 | August 30, 2006 |
| 61 | 9 | "I've Seen the Light" / "Saiou Enters! The Tarot Deck of Destiny"; Transliteration: "Saiō Tōjō! Unmei no Tarotto Dekki" (Japanese: 斎王登場! 運命のタロットデッキ) | Yasuyuki Suzuki | November 30, 2005 | August 31, 2006 |
| 62 | 10 | "A Greater Porpoise" / "New Elemental Hero! Neos"; Transliteration: "Shin Erementaru Hīrō! Neosu" (Japanese: 新Eヒーロー! ネオス) | Junki Takegami | December 7, 2005 | September 1, 2006 |
| 63 | 11 | "Curry Worries" / "Kenzan vs. Demon of the Curry! Spicy Duel"; Transliteration: "Kenzan Vāsasu Karē no Majin! Supaishī Dyueru" (Japanese: 剣山VSカレーの魔人! スパイシーデュエル) | Yoichi Kato | December 14, 2005 | September 5, 2006 |
| 64 | 12 | "Camaraderie Contest" / "Sho vs. Kenzan! A Duel with Passionate Thoughts Toward Big Brother"; Transliteration: "Shō Vāsasu Kenzan! Aniki eno Atsuki Omoi Dyueru" (Japanese: 翔VS剣山! 兄貴への熱き想いデュエル) | Yuki Enatsu | December 21, 2005 | September 6, 2006 |
| 65 | 13 | "No Pain, No Game" / "Hell Kaiser Ryo! Chimeratech Overdragon"; Transliteration: "Heru Kaizā Ryō! Kimeratekku Ōbā Doragon" (Japanese: ヘルカイザー亮!キメラテック·オーバー·ドラゴン) | Yasuyuki Suzuki | December 28, 2005 | September 7, 2006 |
| 66 | 14 | "Going Bananas" / "Judai's New Year Dream Duel!"; Transliteration: "Jūdai Hatsuyume Dyueru" (Japanese: 十代初夢デュエル!) | Junki Takegami | January 4, 2006 | September 8, 2006 |
| 67 | 15 | "Homecoming Duel (Part 1 of 2)" / "VS Edo (Part 1 of 2) - New Power! Aqua Neos"; Transliteration: "Vāsasu Edo (Zenpen) Aratana Chikara! Akua Neosu" (Japanese: VSエド(前編)新たな力! アクア·ネオス) | Shin Yoshida | January 11, 2006 | October 2, 2006 |
| 68 | 16 | "Homecoming Duel (Part 2 of 2)" / "VS Edo (Part 2 of 2) - Flaming Flare Neos"; Transliteration: "Vāsasu Edo (Kōhen) Honō no Furea Neosu" (Japanese: VSエド(後編)炎のフレア·ネオス) | Shin Yoshida | January 18, 2006 | October 3, 2006 |
| 69 | 17 | "Dormitory Demolition" / "Cronos vs. Napoleon! March of Toy Soldiers"; Transliteration: "Kuronosu Vāsasu Naporeon! Toi Sorujā no Kōshin" (Japanese: クロノスVSナポレオン! トイソルジャーの行進) | Natsuko Takahashi | January 25, 2006 | October 4, 2006 |
| 70 | 18 | "Obelisk White?" / "Asuka vs. Manjoume - White Thunder!"; Transliteration: "Asuka Vāsasu Manjōme Howaito Sandā!" (Japanese: 明日香VS万丈目 ホワイトサンダー!) | Junki Takegami | February 1, 2006 | October 5, 2006 |
| 71 | 19 | "DuelFellas" / "VS Game Champ! Giant Battleship Tetran Takes Off"; Transliteration: "Vāsasu Geimu Chanpu! Kyodai Senkan Tetoran Hashin" (Japanese: VSゲームチャンプ! 巨大戦艦テトラン発進) | Yuki Enatsu | February 8, 2006 | October 6, 2006 |
| 72 | 20 | "Not Playing with a Full Deck" / "Destroy Deck Destruction"; Transliteration: "Dekki Hakai wo Hakaiseyo" (Japanese: デッキ破壊を破壊せよ) | Yoichi Kato | February 15, 2006 | October 10, 2006 |
| 73 | 21 | "Source of Strength" / "Kenzan vs. Saiou! Dinosaur DNA"; Transliteration: "Kenzan Vāsasu Saiō! Kyōryū Dī-Enu-Ē da-don" (Japanese: 剣山VS斎王!恐竜DNAだドン) | Junki Takegami | February 22, 2006 | October 11, 2006 |
| 74 | 22 | "Happily Never After" / "Revival Frog! Living Frog! Death Frog!"; Transliteration: "Yomi Gaeru! Iki Gaeru! Desu Gaeru!" (Japanese: 黄泉ガエル!イキカエル!デスガエル!) | Yasuyuki Suzuki | March 1, 2006 | October 12, 2006 |
| 75 | 23 | "Taken by Storm (Part 1 of 2)" / "Field Trip Tag Duel"; Transliteration: "Shūgakuryokō Taggu Dyueru" (Japanese: 修学旅行タッグデュエル) | Shin Yoshida | March 8, 2006 | October 13, 2006 |
| 76 | 24 | "Taken by Storm (Part 2 of 2)" / "Ultimate Alliance! Rex Union"; Transliteration: "Kyūkyoku Gattai! Rekusu Yunion" (Japanese: 究極合体!レックスユニオン) | Shin Yoshida | March 15, 2006 | October 16, 2006 |
| 77 | 25 | "J-Dawg and T-Bone" / "The Four Monarchs of Terror! Demiourgos EMA"; Transliteration: "Kyōfu no Yontei! Demiurugosu Ema" (Japanese: 恐怖の四帝! デミウルゴス·EMA) | Yuki Enatsu | March 22, 2006 | October 17, 2006 |
| 78 | 26 | "Mirror, Mirror (Part 1 of 2)" / "The Strongest Tag!? Judai & Edo (Part 1 of 2)"; Transliteration: "Saikyō Taggu!? Jūdai Ando Edo (Zenpen)" (Japanese: 最強タッグ!? 十代&エド(前編)) | Junki Takegami | March 29, 2006 | October 28, 2006 |
| 79 | 27 | "Mirror, Mirror (Part 2 of 2)" / "The Strongest Tag!? Judai & Edo (Part 2 of 2)"; Transliteration: "Saikyō Taggu!? Jūdai Ando Edo (Kōhen)" (Japanese: 最強タッグ!? 十代&エド(後編)) | Junki Takegami | April 5, 2006 | November 4, 2006 |
| 80 | 28 | "What a Doll!" / "Alice in Despairland"; Transliteration: "Zetsubō no Kuni no Arisu" (Japanese: 絶望の国のアリス) | Natsuko Takahashi | April 12, 2006 | November 11, 2006 |
| 81 | 29 | "Let's Make a Duel!" / "Quiz Duel!? VS Nazora Panel 9"; Transliteration: "Kuizu Dyueru!? Nazorā Paneru Nain" (Japanese: クイズデュエル!? VSナゾラー·パネル9) | Junki Takegami, Yoichi Kato | April 19, 2006 | November 18, 2006 |
| 82 | 30 | "Magnetic Personality" / "Misawa vs. Manjoume - Assault Cannon Beetle"; Transliteration: "Misawa Vāsasu Manjōme Asaruto Kyanon Bītoru" (Japanese: 三沢VS万丈目 アサルト·キャノン·ビートル) | Shin Yoshida | April 26, 2006 | December 2, 2006 |
| 83 | 31 | "Schooling the Master" / "Hell Kaiser Ryo vs. Master Samejima"; Transliteration: "Heru Kaizā Ryō Vāsasu Masutā Samejima" (Japanese: ヘルカイザー亮VSマスター鮫島) | Yasuyuki Suzuki | May 3, 2006 | December 9, 2006 |
| 84 | 32 | "Generation Next" / "Genex Opens! Aim to be Number One!"; Transliteration: "Jenekusu Kaimaku! Mezase Ichiban!" (Japanese: ジェネックス開幕! 目指せー番!) | Junki Takegami | May 10, 2006 | December 16, 2006 |
| 85 | 33 | "Rah, Rah, Ra!" / "The Man who Controls the God Card Winged God-Dragon of Ra"; Transliteration: "Kami no Kādo Rā no Yokushinryū wo Ayatsuru Otoko!?" (Japanese: 神のカード「ラーの翼神竜」を操る男!?) | Yuki Enatsu | May 17, 2006 | December 23, 2006 |
| 86 | 34 | "The Art of the Duel" / "The Duel's Stage Passageway"; Transliteration: "Dyueru no Hanamichi" (Japanese: デュエルの花道) | Natsuko Takahashi | May 24, 2006 | January 6, 2007 |
| 87 | 35 | "Blinded by the Light (Part 1 of 2)" / "Do Your Best! Ojama Trio (Part 1 of 2)"; Transliteration: "Ganbare! Ojama Torio (Zenpen)" (Japanese: がんばれ! おジャマトリオ(前編)) | Shin Yoshida | May 31, 2006 | January 13, 2007 |
| 88 | 36 | "Blinded by the Light (Part 2 of 2)" / "Do Your Best! Ojama Trio (Part 2 of 2)"; Transliteration: "Ganbare! Ojama Torio (Kōhen)" (Japanese: がんばれ! おジャマトリオ(後編)) | Shin Yoshida | June 7, 2006 | January 20, 2007 |
| 89 | 37 | "The Darkness Within" / "Hell Kaiser vs. Darkness Fubuki"; Transliteration: "Heru Kaizā Vāsasu Dākunesu Fubuki" (Japanese: ヘルカイザーVSダークネス吹雪) | Yasuyuki Suzuki | June 14, 2006 | January 31, 2007 |
| 90 | 38 | "Pro-Dueling" / "Academia's Pride"; Transliteration: "Akademia no Puraido" (Japanese: アカデミアのプライド) | Junki Takegami | June 21, 2006 | February 1, 2007 |
| 91 | 39 | "Don't Fear the Reaper" / "The Reaper of One Turn Kill"; Transliteration: "Wan Tān Kiru no Shinigami" (Japanese: ワンターンキルの死神) | Masahiro Hikokubo | June 28, 2006 | February 5, 2007 |
| 92 | 40 | "Duel For Hire" / "Triangle Duel"; Transliteration: "Toraianguru Dyueru" (Japanese: トライアングル·デュエル) | Yuki Enatsu | July 5, 2006 | February 6, 2007 |
| 93 | 41 | "Heart of Ice (Part 1 of 2)" / "The White Night Duel! Judai vs. Asuka (Part 1 of 2)"; Transliteration: "Byakuya no Kettō! Jūdai Vāsasu Asuka (Zenpen)" (Japanese: 白夜の決闘!十代VS明日香(前編)) | Natsuko Takahashi | July 12, 2006 | February 7, 2007 |
| 94 | 42 | "Heart of Ice (Part 2 of 2)" / "White Night's Dragon! Judai vs. Asuka (Part 2 of 2)"; Transliteration: "Howaito Naitsu Doragon! Jūdai Vāsasu Asuka (Kōhen)" (Japanese: 白夜龍!十代VS明日香(後編)) | Natsuko Takahashi | July 19, 2006 | February 8, 2007 |
| 95 | 43 | "Tough Love" / "The Codeless Duel Between Brothers - Ryo vs. Sho"; Transliteration: "Jinginaki Kyōdai Dyueru Ryō Bāsasu Shō" (Japanese: 仁義なき兄弟デュエル 亮VS翔) | Yasuyuki Suzuki | July 26, 2006 | February 9, 2007 |
| 96 | 44 | "It's All Relative" / "The Field of Relativity! Judai vs. The Genius Doctor"; Transliteration: "Sōtaisei Fīrudo! Jūdai Bāsasu Tensai Hakase" (Japanese: 相対性フィールド!十代VS天才博士) | Junki Takegami | August 2, 2006 | February 12, 2007 |
| 97 | 45 | "The Dark Light" / "Enters! The Mysterious World Champ!"; Transliteration: "Tōjō! Nazo no Sekai Chanpu!" (Japanese: 登場!謎の世界チャンプ!) | Shin Yoshida | August 9, 2006 | February 13, 2007 |
| 98 | 46 | "Ultimate Destiny" / "Finally Activated! The Ultimate D-Card"; Transliteration: "Tsuini Hatsudō! Kyūkyoku no Dī no Kādo" (Japanese: ついに発動!究極のDのカード) | Shin Yoshida | August 16, 2006 | February 14, 2007 |
| 99 | 47 | "The Key Factor" / "Judai vs. The Terror of the Laser Satellite"; Transliteration: "Jūdai Vāsasu Rēzā Eisei no Kyōfu" (Japanese: 十代VSレーザー衛星の恐怖) | Natsuko Takahashi | August 23, 2006 | February 15, 2007 |
| 100 | 48 | "The Phoenix Has Landed (Part 1 of 2)" / "Ultimate Arcana "The World""; Transliteration: "Kyūkyoku no Arukana Za Wārudo" (Japanese: 究極のアルカナ「ザ·ワールド」) | Yasuyuki Suzuki | August 30, 2006 | February 16, 2007 |
| 101 | 49 | "The Phoenix Has Landed (Part 2 of 2)" / "Ed, The Finishing Blow! "Bloo-D""; Transliteration: "Edo, Hissatsu no Ichigeki! "Burū-Dī"" (Japanese: エド, 必殺の一撃!「ブルーD」) | Yasuyuki Suzuki | September 6, 2006 | February 20, 2007 |
| 102 | 50 | "The Hands of Justice (Part 1 of 2)" / "The Wave of Light vs. The Neo-Spacians"; Transliteration: "Hikari no Hadō Vāsasu Neo Supēshian" (Japanese: 光の波動VSネオ·スペーシアン) | Junki Takegami | September 13, 2006 | February 21, 2007 |
| 103 | 51 | "The Hands of Justice (Part 2 of 2)" / "Judai's Pinch! Field Magic "Light Barrier""; Transliteration: "Jūdai Pinchi! Fīrudo Mahō Hikari no Kekkai" (Japanese: 十代ピンチ!フィールド魔法「光の結界」) | Junki Takegami | September 20, 2006 | February 22, 2007 |
| 104 | 52 | "Future Changes" / "The Whereabouts of Victory?! Judai vs. Saiou"; Transliteration: "Shōri no Yukue wa?! Jūdai Vāsasu Saiō" (Japanese: 勝利の行方は?!十代VS斎王) | Junki Takegami | September 27, 2006 | February 23, 2007 |

=== Season 3: Dimension World Saga (2006–07) ===
| No. overall | No. in season | English dub title / Japanese translated title | Written by | Original release date | American air date |
|---|---|---|---|---|---|
| 105 | 1 | "Third Time's a Charm" / "Start of the New School Year! The Preminition of Tribulation"; Transliteration: "Shin Gakki Sutāto! Haran no Yokan" (Japanese: 新学期スタート!波乱の予感) | Junki Takegami | October 4, 2006 | April 7, 2007 |
| 106 | 2 | "Jewel of a Duel (Part 1 of 2)" / "Judai and Johan of the Gem Beast Deck"; Transliteration: "Jūdai to Hōgyokujū Dekki no Yohan" (Japanese: 十代と宝玉獣デッキのヨハン) | Shin Yoshida | October 11, 2006 | April 14, 2007 |
| 107 | 3 | "Jewel of a Duel (Part 2 of 2)" / "The Neo-Spacians vs. The Gem Beasts"; Transliteration: "Neo Supēshian Vāsasu Hōgyokujū" (Japanese: ネオ·スペーシアンVS宝玉獣) | Shin Yoshida | October 18, 2006 | April 21, 2007 |
| 108 | 4 | "Hanging with Axel (Part 1 of 2)" / "Professor Cobra's Assassin"; Transliteration: "Purofessā Kobura no Shikaku" (Japanese: プロフェッサー·コブラの刺客) | Junki Takegami | November 1, 2006 | May 5, 2007 |
| 109 | 5 | "Hanging with Axel (Part 2 of 2)" / "Judai and The Fiery O'Brien"; Transliteration: "Jūdai to Honō no Oburaien" (Japanese: 十代と炎のオブライエン) | Junki Takegami | November 8, 2006 | May 12, 2007 |
| 110 | 6 | "Primal Instinct" / "Tyranno Kenzan and Jim of the Fossil Dragon"; Transliteration: "Tirano Kenzan to Kasekiryū no Jimu" (Japanese: ティラノ剣山と化石竜のジム) | Junki Takegami | November 15, 2006 | May 26, 2007 |
| 111 | 7 | "Head in the Clouds (Part 1 of 2)" / "Manjoume and Amon of the Cloud Deck"; Transliteration: "Manjōme to Kumo Dekki no Amon" (Japanese: 万丈目と雲デッキのアモン) | Junki Takegami, Yasuyuki Suzuki | November 22, 2006 | June 16, 2007 |
| 112 | 8 | "Head in the Clouds (Part 2 of 2)" / "Thunder vs. Eye of the Typhoon"; Transliteration: "Sandā Vāsasu Ai Obu Za Taifūn" (Japanese: サンダーVSアイ·オブ·ザ·タイフーン) | Junki Takegami | November 29, 2006 | June 23, 2007 |
| 113 | 9 | "Win Mr. Stein's Duel (Part 1 of 2)" / "Judai vs. The Treacherous Elemental Hero"; Transliteration: "Jūdai Vāsasu Uragiri no Erementaru Hīrō" (Japanese: 十代VS裏切りのEヒーロー) | Shin Yoshida | December 6, 2006 | July 14, 2007 |
| 114 | 10 | "Win Mr. Stein's Duel (Part 2 of 2)" / "A Desperate Struggle! The Scarred Heroes"; Transliteration: "Zettai Zetsumei! Kizudarake no Hīrō" (Japanese: 絶体絶命!傷だらけのヒーロー) | Shin Yoshida | December 13, 2006 | July 21, 2007 |
| 115 | 11 | "Trapper Keeper (Part 1 of 2)" / "Giese the Spirit Hunter"; Transliteration: "Seirei Gari no Gīsu" (Japanese: 精霊狩りのギース) | Masahiro Hikokubo | December 20, 2006 | July 28, 2007 |
| 116 | 12 | "Trapper Keeper (Part 2 of 2)" / "The Gem Beasts vs. Hell Gundog"; Transliteration: "Hōgyokujū Vāsasu Heru Gan Doggu" (Japanese: 宝玉獣VS地獄の番犬) | Masahiro Hikokubo | December 27, 2006 | August 4, 2007 |
| 117 | 13 | "A Snake in the Grass (Part 1 of 3)" / "Decisive Battle! Judai vs. Professor Cobra"; Transliteration: "Kessen! Jūdai Vāsasu Purofessā Kobura" (Japanese: 決戦!十代VSプロフェッサー·コブラ) | Shin Yoshida | January 3, 2007 | September 1, 2007 |
| 118 | 14 | "A Snake in the Grass (Part 2 of 3)" / "The Terror! Vennominon the King of Poisonous Snakes"; Transliteration: "Kyōfu! Dokujaō Venominon" (Japanese: 恐怖!毒蛇王ヴェノミノン) | Shin Yoshida | January 10, 2007 | September 8, 2007 |
| 119 | 15 | "A Snake in the Grass (Part 3 of 3)" / "Triple Contact Fusion! Magma Neos"; Transliteration: "Toripuru Kontakuto Yūgō! Maguma Neosu" (Japanese: トリプルコンタクト融合!マグマ·ネオス) | Shin Yoshida | January 17, 2007 | September 15, 2007 |
| 120 | 16 | "Inter-Dimension Detention" / "A Battle in a Different World! The Gem Beasts vs. Harpie Lady"; Transliteration: "Isekai no Tatakai! Hōgyokujū Vāsasu Hāpyi Redi" (Japanese: 異世界での戦い!宝玉獣VSハーピイレディ) | Junki Takegami | January 24, 2007 | September 22, 2007 |
| 121 | 17 | "Sub-Desert Duel" / "Desert Survival! Johan vs. Doodlebug"; Transliteration: "Sabaku no Sabaibaru! Yohan Vāsasu Arijigoku" (Japanese: 砂漠のサバイバル!ヨハンVS蟻地獄) | Junki Takegami | January 31, 2007 | September 29, 2007 |
| 122 | 18 | "The Night of the Living Duelists" / "The Duel Academia in Crisis! The Terror of the Zombie Students!"; Transliteration: "Dyueru Akademia Kiki! Zonbi Seito no Kyōfu!" (Japanese: デュエルアカデミア危機!ゾンビ生徒の恐怖!) | Koji Ueda | February 7, 2007 | October 6, 2007 |
| 123 | 19 | "School Ghoul Duels" / "The Rei Rescue Operation! Elemental Heroes vs. Fallen Angel Nurse"; Transliteration: "Rei Kyūshutsu Sakusen! Erementaru Hīrō Vāsasu Datenshi Nāsu" (Japanese: レイ救出作戦!E·ヒーローVS堕天使ナース) | Koji Ueda | February 14, 2007 | October 13, 2007 |
| 124 | 20 | "Triple Play (Part 1 of 2)" / "Disruption in the Academy! A Duel, Hungry"; Transliteration: "Gakuen Bunretsu! Harapeko Dyueru" (Japanese: 学園分裂!腹ペコデュエル) | Yasuyuki Suzuki | February 21, 2007 | October 20, 2007 |
| 125 | 21 | "Triple Play (Part 2 of 2)" / "Johan, Jim, and O'Brien vs. The Three Masked Knights"; Transliteration: "Yohan Jimu Oburaien Vāsasu Kamen no Sankishi" (Japanese: ヨハン·ジム·オブライエンVS仮面の三騎士) | Yasuyuki Suzuki | February 28, 2007 | November 3, 2007 |
| 126 | 22 | "Return of the Sacred Beasts" / "Judai vs. Manjome - Dark Sword the Dragon Knight"; Transliteration: "Jūdai Vāsasu Manjōme Ryūkishi Dāku Sōdo" (Japanese: 十代VS万丈目·竜騎士ダークソード) | Yasuyuki Suzuki | March 7, 2007 | November 10, 2007 |
| 127 | 23 | "Breaking of the Sacred Seal" / "The one who Releases the Seal - Martin"; Transliteration: "Fūin wo Yabureshimono Marutan" (Japanese: 封印を破りし者·マルタン) | Yasuyuki Suzuki | March 14, 2007 | January 19, 2008 |
| 128 | 24 | "A Dimensional Duel" / "The Gem Beasts vs. Cyber End Dragon"; Transliteration: "Hōgyokujū Vāsasu Saibā Endo Doragon" (Japanese: 宝玉獣VSサイバー·エンド·ドラゴン) | Shin Yoshida | March 21, 2007 | January 26, 2008 |
| 129 | 25 | "Unleash the Dragon (Part 1 of 2)" / "Threat of the Three Phantom Demons! Judai vs. Martin"; Transliteration: "Sangenma no Kyōi! Jūdai Vāsasu Marutan" (Japanese: 三幻魔の脅威!十代VSマルタン) | Shin Yoshida | March 28, 2007 | February 2, 2008 |
| 130 | 26 | "Unleash the Dragon (Part 2 of 2)" / "The Awakening Of The Rainbow Dragon"; Transliteration: "Reinbō Doragon Kakusei" (Japanese: レインボードラゴン覚醒) | Shin Yoshida | April 4, 2007 | February 9, 2008 |
| 131 | 27 | "All For One" / "Great Gathering of Ace Cards! Open, Door of Different Dimension!"; Transliteration: "Ēsu Kādo Daishūgō!! Hirake, Jigen no Tobira!" (Japanese: エースカード大集合!!開け, 次元の扉!) | Junki Takegami | April 11, 2007 | February 16, 2008 |
| 132 | 28 | "A New World Order" / "Duel That Bets Life-or-Death"; Transliteration: "Seishi wo Kaketa Dyueru" (Japanese: 生死を賭けた決闘(デュエル)) | Koji Ueda | April 18, 2007 | February 23, 2008 |
| 133 | 29 | "Friend or Fiend" / "Judai vs. Scarr, Scout of Dark World"; Transliteration: "Jūdai Vāsasu Ankokukai no Sekkō Sukā" (Japanese: 十代VS暗黒界の斥候スカー) | Yasuyuki Suzuki | April 25, 2007 | March 1, 2008 |
| 134 | 30 | "Dueling With The Dark Army" / "Judai vs. Zure, Knight of Dark World"; Transliteration: "Jūdai Vāsasu Ankokukai no Kishi Zūru" (Japanese: 十代VS暗黒界の騎士ズール) | Yasuyuki Suzuki | May 2, 2007 | March 8, 2008 |
| 135 | 31 | "Turning The Page (Part 1 of 2)" / "Judai vs. Brron, Mad King of Dark World"; Transliteration: "Jūdai Vāsasu Ankokukai no Kyō'ō Buron" (Japanese: 十代VS暗黒界の狂王ブロン) | Junki Takegami | May 9, 2007 | March 15, 2008 |
| 136 | 32 | "Turning The Page (Part 2 of 2)" / "Activate Wicked Scriptures! Reign, Overlord of Dark World"; Transliteration: "Jashin Kyōten Hatsudō! Ankokukai no Mashin Rein" (Japanese: 邪心経典発動!暗黒界の魔神レイン) | Junki Takegami | May 16, 2007 | March 22, 2008 |
| 137 | 33 | "The State of Syrus" / "Sho's Determination! 'The Proof of Friendship'"; Transliteration: "Shō no Ketsui! Yūjō no Akashi" (Japanese: 翔の決意!「友情の証」) | Koji Ueda | May 23, 2007 | March 29, 2008 |
| 138 | 34 | "The Darkness Is Revealed" / "Supreme King Descends - The Death Duelists"; Transliteration: "Haō Kōrin Shi no Dyueristo-tachi" (Japanese: 覇王降臨·死の決闘者たち) | Masahiro Hikokubo | May 30, 2007 | April 5, 2008 |
| 139 | 35 | "A Sight Unseen (Part 1 of 2)" / "Dark Fusion! Inferno Wing!!"; Transliteration: "Dāku Fyūjon! Inferuno Wingu!!" (Japanese: ダーク·フュージョン!インフェルノ·ウイング!!) | Junki Takegami, Masahiro Hikokubo | June 6, 2007 | April 12, 2008 |
| 140 | 36 | "A Sight Unseen (Part 2 of 2)" / "First and Last, Super Fusion Activates!"; Transliteration: "Kūzenzetsugo Chō Yūgō Hatsudō!" (Japanese: 空前絶後·超融合発動!) | Masahiro Hikokubo | June 13, 2007 | April 19, 2008 |
| 141 | 37 | "What Lies Beneath (Part 1 of 3)" / "Supreme King of Terror! The Wandering O'Brien"; Transliteration: "Kyōfu no Haō! Samayoeru Oburaien" (Japanese: 恐怖の覇王!彷徨えるオブライエン) | Shin Yoshida | June 20, 2007 | April 26, 2008 |
| 142 | 38 | "What Lies Beneath (Part 2 of 3)" / "The Victor is Righteous! Supreme King vs. O'Brien"; Transliteration: "Kachinokoru mono ga Seigi! Haō Vāsasu Oburaien" (Japanese: 勝ち残る者が正義!覇王VSオブライエン) | Shin Yoshida | June 27, 2007 | May 3, 2008 |
| 143 | 39 | "What Lies Beneath (Part 3 of 3)" / "Volcanic Devil vs. The Most Heinous Evil Hero"; Transliteration: "Vorukanikku Debiru Vāsasu Saikyō no Ībiru Hīrō" (Japanese: ヴォルカニック･デビルVS最凶のイービル·ヒーロー) | Shin Yoshida | July 4, 2007 | May 10, 2008 |
| 144 | 40 | "The Forbidden Ritual (Part 1 of 2)" / "Activate! The Ultimate Unsealing Ritualistic Technique"; Transliteration: "Hatsudō! Kyūkyoku Fūinkaihō Gishikijutsu" (Japanese: 発動!究極封印解放儀式術) | Yasuyuki Suzuki | July 11, 2007 | May 17, 2008 |
| 145 | 41 | "The Forbidden Ritual (Part 2 of 2)" / "Summon Exodius the Ultimate Forbidden God!"; Transliteration: "Shōkan Kyūkyoku Fūinshin Ekuzodiosu" (Japanese: 究極封印神エクゾディオス召喚!) | Yasuyuki Suzuki | July 18, 2007 | May 24, 2008 |
| 146 | 42 | "Conquering the Past (Part 1 of 3)" / "The Sealed Fusion"; Transliteration: "Fūinsareta Yūgō" (Japanese: 封印された融合) | Junki Takegami | July 25, 2007 | May 31, 2008 |
| 147 | 43 | "Conquering the Past (Part 2 of 3)" / "Showdown of Fate! Cyber-Style vs. The Gem Beasts"; Transliteration: "Innen no Taiketsu! Saibā-ryū Vāsasu Hōgyokujū" (Japanese: 因縁の対決!サイバー流VS宝玉獣) | Junki Takegami | August 8, 2007 | June 7, 2008 |
| 148 | 44 | "Conquering the Past (Part 3 of 3)" / "Ultimate Dragon Showdown! Cyber End vs. Rainbow Dark"; Transliteration: "Kyūkyoku Doragon Taiketsu! Saibā Endo VS Reinbō Dāku" (Japanese: 究極ドラゴン対決!サイバー･エンドVSレインボー·ダーク) | Junki Takegami | August 15, 2007 | June 14, 2008 |
| 149 | 45 | "The Ultimate Face-Off (Part 1 of 2)" / "Demon God Showdown! The Phantom Demons vs. Exodia!"; Transliteration: "Majin Taiketsu! Genma VS Ekuzodia" (Japanese: 魔神対決!幻魔VSエクゾディア) | Yasuyuki Suzuki | August 22, 2007 | July 26, 2008 |
| 150 | 46 | "The Ultimate Face-Off (Part 2 of 2)" / "Summon 'Yubel'!"; Transliteration: ""Yuberu" Shōkan!" (Japanese: "ユベル"召喚!) | Yasuyuki Suzuki | August 29, 2007 | August 2, 2008 |
| 151 | 47 | "The Power Within (Part 1 of 2)" / "Neos vs. The Advanced Gem Beasts"; Transliteration: "Neosu VS Adobansudo Hōgyokujū" (Japanese: ネオスVSアドバンスド宝玉獣) | Koji Ueda | September 5, 2007 | August 9, 2008 |
| 152 | 48 | "The Power Within (Part 2 of 2)" / "Activate Super Fusion! Rainbow Neos"; Transliteration: "Chō Yūgō Hatsudō! Reinbō Neosu" (Japanese: 超融合発動!レインボー·ネオス) | Koji Ueda | September 12, 2007 | August 9, 2008 |
| 153 | 49 | "Return of the Supreme King (Part 1 of 3)" / "Showdown of the Chosen Cards! Elemental Heroes vs. Yubel"; Transliteration: "Eraba Reshi Kādo Taiketsu! Erementaru Hīrō VS Yuberu" (Japanese: 選ばれしカード対決!エレメンタル·ヒーローVSユベル) | Junki Takegami | September 19, 2007 | August 16, 2008 |
| 154 | 50 | "Return of the Supreme King (Part 2 of 3)" / "Supreme King Judai Resurrected!"; Transliteration: "Yomigaeru Haō Jūdai!" (Japanese: 甦る覇王十代!) | Junki Takegami | September 26, 2007 | August 16, 2008 |
| 155 | 51 | "Return of the Supreme King (Part 3 of 3)" / "Rainbow Neos vs. Yubel Ultimate Form"; Transliteration: "Reinbō Neosu VS Yuberu Kyūkyoku tai" (Japanese: レインボー·ネオスVSユベル究極態) | Junki Takegami | October 3, 2007 | August 23, 2008 |
| 156 | 52 | "Judai Revived!? A Brand New Journey"; Transliteration: "Jūdai Fukkatsu!? Aratanaru Tabidachi" (Japanese: 十代復活!?新たなる旅立ち) | Junki Takegami | October 10, 2007 | N/A |

=== Season 4: Darkness Saga (2007–08) ===
| No. | Title | Written by | Original release date |
|---|---|---|---|
| 157 | "A Creeping Threat! The Mysterious Visitor"; Transliteration: "Shinobiyoru Kyōi! Nazo no Raihōsha" (Japanese: 忍びよる脅威!「謎の来訪者」) | Shin Yoshida | October 17, 2007 |
| 158 | "Farewell, Duel Academia! Judai's Chosen Path"; Transliteration: "Saraba Dyueru Academia! Judai No Erabu Michi" (Japanese: さらばデュエルアカデミア!十代の選ぶ道) | Shin Yoshida | October 24, 2007 |
| 159 | "The Truth Behind Darkness! Judai vs. Fubuki"; Transliteration: "Dākunesu no Shinsō! Judai VS Fubuki" (Japanese: ダークネスの真相!十代VS吹雪) | Shin Yoshida | October 31, 2007 |
| 160 | "Fusing Souls! Neos VS F-G-D"; Transliteration: "Yūgō Suru Tamashī! Neosu VS F·G·D" (Japanese: 融合する魂!ネオスVS F·G·D) | Shin Yoshida | November 7, 2007 |
| 161 | "Shall We Duel? Invitation to a Pair Duel"; Transliteration: "Sharu Ui Dyueru? Pea Dyueru e no Shōtai" (Japanese: シャル·ウイ·デュエル?ペアデュエルへの招待) | Koji Ueda | November 14, 2007 |
| 162 | "Judai vs. Asuka! Face-Down Card of Hidden Emotions"; Transliteration: "Jūdai VS Asuka Himeta Omoi no Fuse Kādo" (Japanese: 十代VS明日香! 秘めた想いの伏せカード) | Koji Ueda | November 21, 2007 |
| 163 | "Challenge from Psycho Shocker"; Transliteration: "Saiko Shokkā Kara no Chōsen-jō" (Japanese: サイコ·ショッカーからの挑戦状) | Yasuyuki Suzuki | November 28, 2007 |
| 164 | "The Inherited Cyber Dark Dragon"; Transliteration: "Uketsuga Reshi Saibā Dāku Doragon" (Japanese: 受け継がれしサイバー·ダーク·ドラゴン) | Yasuyuki Suzuki | December 5, 2007 |
| 165 | "Aim for it Manjoume! Path to a Pro Duelist!"; Transliteration: "Mezase Manjōme! Puro Dyuerisuto e no Michi!" (Japanese: 目指せ万丈目!プロデュエリストへの道!) | Toyokazu Sakamoto, Shin Yoshida | December 12, 2007 |
| 166 | "Armed Dragon vs. Dragoon D End"; Transliteration: "Āmudo Doragon Bāsasu Doragūn Dī Endo" (Japanese: アームド·ドラゴンVSドラグーン·D·エンド) | Toyokazu Sakamoto, Shin Yoshida | December 19, 2007 |
| 167 | "Gratitude Duel! Chronos vs. The Original Dropout Boy"; Transliteration: "Ongaeshi Dyueru! Kuronosu Basasu Kanzo Doroppuauto Bōi" (Japanese: 恩返しデュエル!クロノスVS元祖ドロップアウト·ボーイ) | Koji Ueda | December 26, 2007 |
| 168 | "Opening of Graduation Duel! Neos vs. Black Flame Dragon of Horus"; Transliteration: "Sotsugyō Dyueru Kaishi! Neosu VS Horusu no Kokuen Ryū" (Japanese: 卒業デュエル開始 ! ネオスVSホルスの黒炎竜) | Shin Yoshida | January 4, 2008 |
| 169 | "Price of Decision! O'Brien Flame of Darkness"; Transliteration: "Ketsudan no Daishō! Oburaien no Yami" (Japanese: 決断の代償 ! オブライエン炎の闇) | Yasuyuki Suzuki | January 9, 2008 |
| 170 | "Saiou, Again! Activate "Decisive Power of Absolute Destiny"!!"; Transliteration: "Saiō Futatabi! "Zettai unmei Kettei-ryoku" Hatsudō!!" (Japanese: 斎王再び!「絶対運命決定力」発動!!) | Koji Ueda | January 16, 2008 |
| 171 | "End of Destiny! Magma Neos vs. Dark Ruler"; Transliteration: "Unmei no Shūen! Maguma Neosu VS Za Dāku Rūrā" (Japanese: 運命の終焉!マグマ·ネオスVSザ·ダーク·ルーラー) | Koji Ueda | January 23, 2008 |
| 172 | "Duel Academia Crisis! The Gem Beasts Blocking the Way"; Transliteration: "Dyueru Akademia no Kiki! Tachiha Dakaru Hōgyokujū" (Japanese: デュエルアカデミアの危機! 立ちはだかる宝玉獣) | Toyokazu Sakamoto | January 30, 2008 |
| 173 | "Invasion of Darkness! The Stolen Memories"; Transliteration: "Dākunesu no Shinkō! Ubawareta Kioku" (Japanese: ダークネスの侵攻! 奪われた記憶) | Masahiro Hikokubo | February 6, 2008 |
| 174 | "Activate, Clear World! Ferocious Negative Effect"; Transliteration: "Hatsudō! (Kuriā Wārudo) Kyōfu no Negatibu Efekuto" (Japanese: 発動!「クリアー·ワールド」恐怖のネガティブエフェクト) | Masahiro Hikokubo | February 13, 2008 |
| 175 | "Battle Royale! Judai vs. Johan vs. Fujiwara"; Transliteration: "Batoru Rowaiaru! Jūdai VS Yohan VS Fujiwara" (Japanese: バトルロワイヤル!十代VSヨハンVS藤原) | Yasuyuki Suzuki | February 20, 2008 |
| 176 | "Rainbow Neos, Protector of Bonds vs. Clear Vicious Knight"; Transliteration: "Kizuna o Mamori Shimo no Reinbō Neosu VS Kuriā Vishasu Naito" (Japanese: 絆を守りしものレインボー･ネオスVSクリアー·ヴィシャス·ナイト) | Yasuyuki Suzuki | February 27, 2008 |
| 177 | "Combo of Terror! "Zero and Infinity""; Transliteration: "Kyōfu no Konbo! "Kyomu to Mugen"" (Japanese: 恐怖のコンボ!「虚無と無限」) | Shin Yoshida | March 5, 2008 |
| 178 | "Final Hope! Judai Yuki"; Transliteration: "Saigo no Kibō! Yūki Jūdai" (Japanese: 最後の希望!遊城十代) | Shin Yoshida | March 12, 2008 |
| 179 | "Good-Bye Judai! A Tearful Graduation Ceremony"; Transliteration: "Sayonara Jūdai! Namida no Sotsugyō Shiki" (Japanese: さよなら十代!涙の卒業式) | Shin Yoshida | March 19, 2008 |
| 180 | "The True Graduation Duel! Judai vs. Legendary Duelist"; Transliteration: "Shin no Sotsugyō Dyueru! Jūdai VS Densetsu no Dyuerisuto" (Japanese: 真の卒業デュエル!十代VS伝説のデュエリスト) | Shin Yoshida | March 26, 2008 |

== DVD releases ==
=== Region 1 (North America) ===
The release in America was the 4Kids Entertainment dubbed version that was aired on American television on Cartoon Network, 4KidsTV, The CW4Kids, and on Canadian television on YTV. It is released by FUNimation Entertainment. The series is now being released through New Video Group in the form of season box sets.

| Volume | Volume name | Release date | Contents |
|---|---|---|---|
| 1 | Welcome to Duel Academy | September 12, 2006 | Episodes 1 - 6 |
| 2 | Tag Team Trial | January 30, 2007 | Episodes 7 - 13 |
| 3 | King of the Copycats | May 22, 2007 | Episodes 14 - 20 |
| 4 | The School Duel | September 18, 2007 | Episodes 21 - 28 |
| 5 | Rise of the Sacred Beasts - Part 1 | October 14, 2008 | Episodes 29 - 40 |
| 6 | Rise of the Sacred Beasts - Part 2 | September 22, 2009 | Episodes 41 - 52 |
| 7 | Yu-Gi-Oh! GX: Season 1 | October 14, 2014 | Episodes 1 - 52 |
| 8 | Yu-Gi-Oh! GX: Season 2 | July 7, 2015 | Episodes 53 - 104 |
| 9 | Yu-Gi-Oh! GX: Season 3 | March 8, 2016 | Episodes 105 - 155 |

=== Region 2 (UK) ===
The release in UK was the 4Kids Entertainment dubbed version that was aired on television on CITV, ITV2 on the GMTV2 block, ITV4 on the GMTV2 block and Nicktoons. It is released by Contender Home Entertainment. On July 5, 2016, the UK based Anime distributor company, Manga Entertainment, announced they'd release the entire first season of the series on DVD, being released November 21, 2016, followed swiftly by a second Season release during February 2017 and an upcoming release of the entire third season in June 2017.

| Volume | Volume name | Release date | Contents |
|---|---|---|---|
| 1 | Welcome to Duel Academy | September 11, 2006 | Episodes 1 - 4 |
| 2 | Tag Team Trial | June 8, 2007 | Episodes 5 - 12 |
| 3 | King of the Copycats | April 7, 2008 | Episodes 13 - 20 |
| 1; 2; 3 | Welcome to Duel Academy; Tag Team Trial; King of the Copycats | August 27, 2007 | Episodes 1 - 20 |
| 1; 2 | Yu-Gi-Oh! GX: Season 1 | November 21, 2016 | Episodes 1 - 52 |
| 3; 4 | Yu-Gi-Oh! GX: Season 2 | February 6, 2017 | Episodes 53 - 104 |
| 5; 6 | Yu-Gi-Oh! GX: Season 3 | June 12, 2017 | Episodes 105 - 155 |

=== Region 2 (Japan) ===
The release in Japan was the original Japanese version that was aired on television on TV Tokyo. It is released by Record Hanbaimo.

| Volume | Volume name | Release date | Contents |
|---|---|---|---|
| 1 | Yu-Gi-Oh Duel Monsters GX Duel Box 1 (遊☆戯☆王 デュエルモンスターズGX Duel Box 1, Yū☆gi☆ō Dyueru Monsutāzu Jī Ekkusu Dyueru Bokkusu Wan) | June 15, 2005 | Episodes 1 - 12 |
| 2 | Yu-Gi-Oh Duel Monsters GX Duel Box 2 (遊☆戯☆王 デュエルモンスターズGX Duel Box 2, Yū☆gi☆ō Dyueru Monsutāzu Jī Ekkusu Dyueru Bokkusu Tsū) | September 21, 2005 | Episodes 13 - 24 |
| 3 | Yu-Gi-Oh Duel Monsters GX Duel Box 3 (遊☆戯☆王 デュエルモンスターズGX Duel Box 3, Yū☆gi☆ō Dyueru Monsutāzu Jī Ekkusu Dyueru Bokkusu Suri) | December 14, 2005 | Episodes 25 - 36 |
| 4 | Yu-Gi-Oh Duel Monsters GX Duel Box 4 (遊☆戯☆王 デュエルモンスターズGX Duel Box 4, Yū☆gi☆ō Dyueru Monsutāzu Jī Ekkusu Dyueru Bokkusu Foa) | March 15, 2006 | Episodes 37 - 48 |
| 5 | Yu-Gi-Oh Duel Monsters GX Duel Box 5 (遊☆戯☆王 デュエルモンスターズGX Duel Box 5, Yū☆gi☆ō Dyueru Monsutāzu Jī Ekkusu Dyueru Bokkusu Faibu) | June 21, 2006 | Episodes 49 - 60 |
| 6 | Yu-Gi-Oh Duel Monsters GX Duel Box 6 (遊☆戯☆王 デュエルモンスターズGX Duel Box 6, Yū☆gi☆ō Dyueru Monsutāzu Jī Ekkusu Dyueru Bokkusu Sikkusu) | September 20, 2006 | Episodes 61 - 72 |
| 7 | Yu-Gi-Oh Duel Monsters GX Duel Box 7 (遊☆戯☆王 デュエルモンスターズGX Duel Box 7, Yū☆gi☆ō Dyueru Monsutāzu Jī Ekkusu Dyueru Bokkusu Seben) | December 20, 2006 | Episodes 73 - 84 |
| 8 | Yu-Gi-Oh Duel Monsters GX Duel Box 8 (遊☆戯☆王 デュエルモンスターズGX Duel Box 8, Yū☆gi☆ō Dyueru Monsutāzu Jī Ekkusu Dyueru Bokkusu Eito) | March 21, 2007 | Episodes 85 - 96 |
| 9 | Yu-Gi-Oh Duel Monsters GX Duel Box 9 (遊☆戯☆王 デュエルモンスターズGX Duel Box 9, Yū☆gi☆ō Dyueru Monsutāzu Jī Ekkusu Dyueru Bokkusu Nain) | June 20, 2007 | Episodes 97 - 108 |
| 10 | Yu-Gi-Oh Duel Monsters GX Duel Box 10 (遊☆戯☆王 デュエルモンスターズGX Duel Box 10, Yū☆gi☆ō Dyueru Monsutāzu Jī Ekkusu Dyueru Bokkusu Ten) | September 19, 2007 | Episodes 109 - 120 |
| 11 | Yu-Gi-Oh Duel Monsters GX Duel Box 11 (遊☆戯☆王 デュエルモンスターズGX Duel Box 11, Yū☆gi☆ō Dyueru Monsutāzu Jī Ekkusu Dyueru Bokkusu Ireben) | December 19, 2007 | Episodes 121 - 132 |
| 12 | Yu-Gi-Oh Duel Monsters GX Duel Box 12 (遊☆戯☆王 デュエルモンスターズGX Duel Box 12, Yū☆gi☆ō Dyueru Monsutāzu Jī Ekkusu Dyueru Bokkusu Tuerufu) | September 21, 2008 | Episodes 133 - 144 |
| 13 | Yu-Gi-Oh Duel Monsters GX Duel Box 13 (遊☆戯☆王 デュエルモンスターズGX Duel Box 13, Yū☆gi☆ō Dyueru Monsutāzu Jī Ekkusu Dyueru Bokkusu Sātin) | June 18, 2008 | Episodes 145 - 156 |
| 14 | Yu-Gi-Oh Duel Monsters GX Duel Box 14 (遊☆戯☆王 デュエルモンスターズGX Duel Box 14, Yū☆gi☆ō Dyueru Monsutāzu Jī Ekkusu Dyueru Bokkusu Foatin) | July 16, 2008 | Episodes 157 - 168 |
| 15 | Yu-Gi-Oh Duel Monsters GX Duel Box 15 (遊☆戯☆王 デュエルモンスターズGX Duel Box 15, Yū☆gi☆ō Dyueru Monsutāzu Jī Ekkusu Dyueru Bokkusu Fifutin) | August 20, 2008 | Episodes 169 - 180 |

=== Region 2 (Denmark) ===
SF Studios released 16 volumes, containing all of season 1. The DVDs include both Swedish and Danish audio, but no subtitles. The Same DVDs were also released in Sweden, but with Swedish titles and cover art.

| Volume | Volume name | Release date | Contents |
|---|---|---|---|
| 1 | Velkommen Til Duel Akademiet | December 2, 2008 | Episodes 1 - 3 |
| 2 | Skyggeduellanten | December 2, 2008 | Episodes 4 - 6 |
| 3 | Den Usædvanlige Straf | December 2, 2008 | Episodes 7 - 9 |
| 4 | Dobbeltduellen | December 2, 2008 | Episodes 10 - 12 |
| 5 | Farlig Leg | December 2, 2008 | Episodes 13 - 15 |
| 6 | Duellkæmpen | May 12, 2009 | Episodes 16 - 19 |
| 7 | Jaden Mod Bastion | May 12, 2009 | Episodes 20 - 22 |
| 8 | Skoleduellen | May 12, 2009 | Episodes 23 - 26 |
| 9 | Dommedagsduellen | May 12, 2009 | Episodes 27 - 30 |
| 10 | Vampyren | May 12, 2009 | Episodes 30 - 33 |
| 11 | Mareridtet | March 16, 2010 | Episodes 34 - 37 |
| 12 | Admiralen | March 16, 2010 | Episodes 38 - 40 |
| 13 | Vilde Hjerter | March 16, 2010 | Episodes 41 - 43 |
| 14 | Duellen Mod Amnael | March 16, 2010 | Episodes 44 - 46 |
| 15 | De Hellige Beast-Kort | March 16, 2010 | Episodes 47 - 49 |
| 16 | Afslutningsduellen | March 16, 2010 | Episodes 50 - 52 |

=== Region 4 (Australia) ===
The release in Australia was the 4Kids Entertainment dubbed version that was aired on television on Cartoon Network. It is released by Magna.

| Volume | Volume name | Release date | Contents |
|---|---|---|---|
| 1; 2 | The Next King of Games | September 8, 2006 | Episodes 1 - 8 |
| 3; 4 | Tag Team Trial | September 8, 2006 | Episodes 9 - 16 |
| 5; 6 | The King Of Copycats | December 13, 2006 | Episodes 17 - 24 |
| 7; 8 | Graverisk | March 7, 2007 | Episodes 25 - 33 |
| 9; 10 | The Dark Scorpions | June 5, 2007 | Episode 34 - 41 |
| 11; 12 | Amnael's Endgame; Rise of the Sacred Beasts | September 12, 2007 | Episode 42 - 52 |
