= Sharon Mazer =

New Zealand professor, writer, and researcher

Sharon Mazer is an academic in New Zealand who is professor of theatre and performance studies at Auckland University of Technology. She is known for her book, Professional Wrestling: Sport and Spectacle, and as a researcher of popular performance.

== Academic career ==
After completing a BA at Reed College in Portland, Oregon in 1977, Mazer worked for some years as a theatre director. She returned to study, graduating with an MA from University of California, Los Angeles in 1985 and then moving to New York to study at Columbia University for a MPhil in 1989 and a PhD in 1991.

Mazer moved to New Zealand in 1994 to lecture at the University of Canterbury in Christchurch. She joined Auckland University of Technology in 2014, where she was promoted to full professor in November 2019.

== Selected works ==
=== Books ===
- Mazer, Sharon (February 1998), Professional wrestling: Sport and spectacle, University Press of Mississippi (published 1998), ISBN 1578060214
- Mazer, Sharon, ed. (8 February 2019), The intricate art of actually caring, and other New Zealand plays, Seagull Books (published 2018), ISBN 978-0-85742-340-5
- Mazer, Sharon (4 February 2019), I have loved me a man: The life & times of Mika, Auckland University Press (published 2018), ISBN 978-1-77671-010-2

=== Articles ===
- Mazer, Sharon (4 July 2018). "New Hazardscapes for Old: Rupture, resilience, resistance". Performance Research. 23 (4–5): 111–115. doi:10.1080/13528165.2018.1506547. ISSN 1352-8165. S2CID 192683390.
- Mazer, Sharon (29 January 2019). "That was then, this is now: Māori Performance Research Comes of Age". Te Kaharoa. 13 (3). doi:10.24135/tekaharoa.v13i3.248. ISSN 1178-6035.
- Mazer, Sharon (19 July 2019). "A Bicultural Dream in Aotearoa New Zealand: (De)Colonising Shakespeare?". Te Kaharoa. 12 (1). doi:10.24135/tekaharoa.v12i1.271. ISSN 1178-6035.
- Mazer, Sharon (25 February 2020). "From Performance to Performativity: The Christchurch Mosque Murders and What Came After". Te Kaharoa. 15 (1). doi:10.24135/tekaharoa.v15i1.285. ISSN 1178-6035.
