= Dodge Demon (concept car) =

Concept car developed by Dodge

Dodge Demon Concept
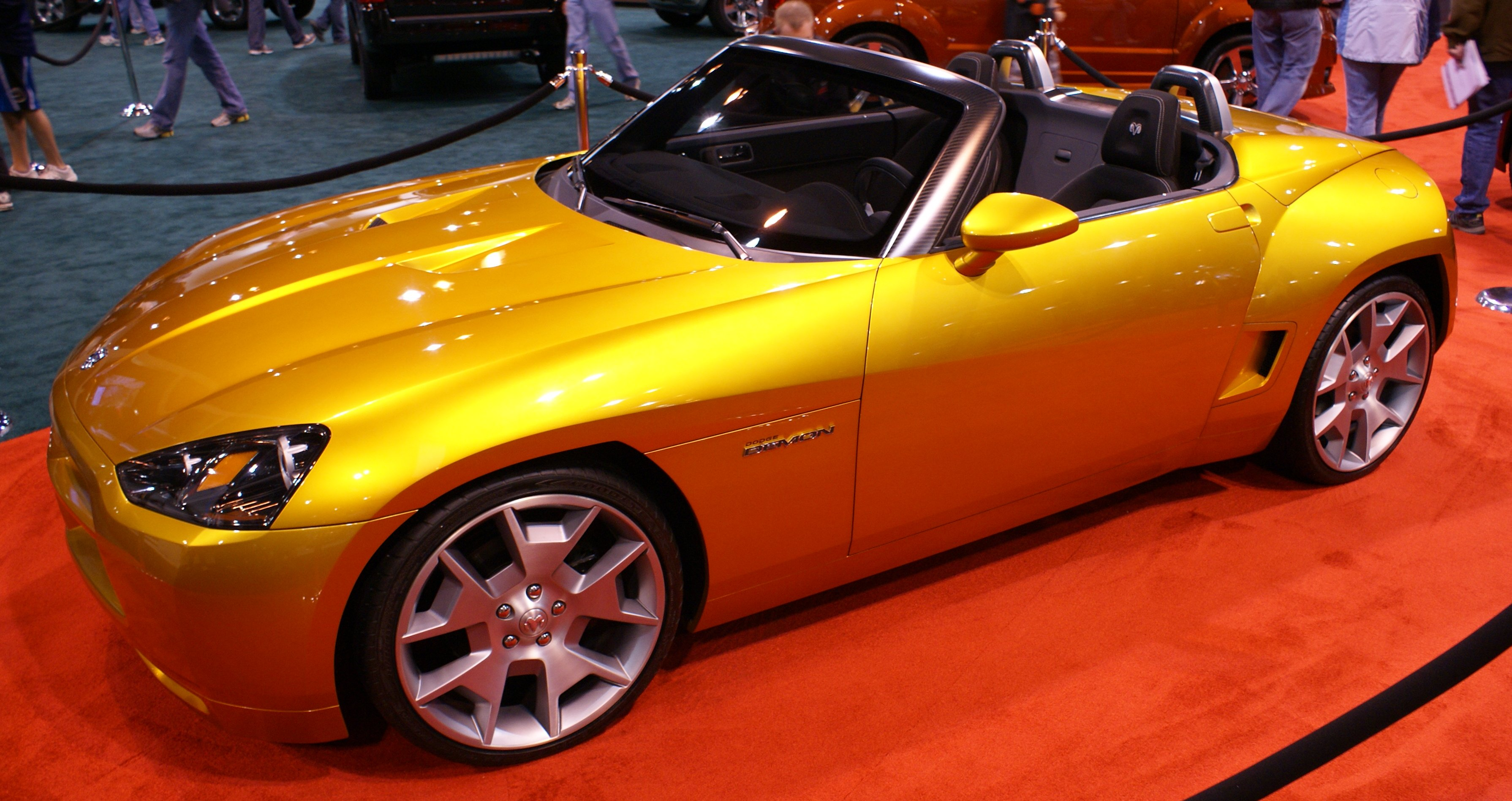
- Dodge Demon Concept at the 2008 Denver Auto Show

Overview
- Manufacturer: DaimlerChrysler
- Production: 2007

Body and chassis
- Class: Concept car
- Body style: 2-door roadster
- Layout: Front-engine, rear-wheel drive

Powertrain
- Engine: 2.4 L GEMA I4
- Transmission: 6-speed manual

Dimensions
- Wheelbase: 95.6 in (2,428 mm)
- Length: 156.5 in (3,975 mm)
- Width: 68.3 in (1,735 mm)
- Height: 51.8 in (1,316 mm)
- Curb weight: 2,600 lb (1,179 kg) (Estimated)

The Dodge Demon was a roadster concept car made by DaimlerChrysler, designed to be slotted below the Viper for the Dodge brand. The name was previously used in the 1970s for the Dodge Dart Demon, a fastback model.

The Demon was first shown at the 2007 Geneva Auto Show, and was considered for production. The materials, construction, and design of the Demon were such that production would be feasible.

It was powered by a 2.4 2.4 L gasoline World Engine, producing 172 hp (128 kW) at 6000 rpm and 165 lb⋅ft (224 N⋅m) of torque at 4400 rpm.

It was conceived to compete with cars like the Pontiac Solstice, Saturn Sky, and Mazda MX-5.
