= Daimon (name) =

Daimon is both a Japanese surname and a given name. Notable people with the name include:

- Daimon Shelton (born 1972), professional American football player
- Mikishi Daimon (大門 実紀史, born 1956), Japanese politician
- Yayoi Daimon (born 1991), Japanese musician and dancer

Fictional characters:

- Daimon, antagonist in the Dark-Hunter book series
- Daimon (Sailor Moon) (ダイモーン), series of antagonists in the Sailor Moon metaseries
- Daimon (Star Trek), Ferengi rank in the Star Trek universe
- Daimon Hellstrom, character in the Marvel Comics universe
- Goro Daimon (大門 五郎), character in The King of Fighters series of fighting games
- Iwao Daimon (大門 巌), character in Tokusou Exceedraft
- Masaru Daimon (大門 大), character in Danganronpa Another Episode: Ultra Despair Girls
- Daimon Masaru, character in Digimon Data Squad
- Suguru Daimon (大門 英), character in Digimon Data Squad
- Daimon Tatsumi, character in Kyukyu Sentai GoGoV
- Daimon Michiko (大門 未知子), character in Doctor-X
