= Demons (From Her Eyes EP) =

Demons - EP

EP by From Her Eyes
- Released: 25 August 2014
- Recorded: April 2014
- Genre: Metalcore, Post-hardcore
- Label: Independent
- Producer: Jonny Renshaw

Singles from Demons
- 1. "Porcelain" Released: 1 August 2015

Demons was the first major EP released by From Her Eyes on 25 August 2014.

== Production ==
Demons was the first major EP released by From Her Eyes on 25 August 2014. After recording a demo EP in early 2013 from initial live songs, From Her Eyes were unsatisfied with their released material. Wanting to progress more towards melodic metalcore sound and shy away from clean vocals, the band released ex-Rhythm Guitarist Indigo Lani Lewis-Jones who was present with their demo. This was also the first release with Jesse Simmonds, who replaced ex-bassist and founding member Luke Williams in late 2013.

With From Her Eyes being big fans of the work of Devil Sold His Soul and The Elijah, the band decided to enlist Jonny Renshaw to record, produce and mix the record, feeling he could capture the new melodic sound they were searching for.

After recording iduring April 2014, the band released the EP on 25 August 2014, with an EP Launch show the week prior with friends and local compatriots Breathe in the Silence and Set to Break (now Captors) supporting.

== Track list ==
Demons - EP
| No. | Title | Length |
|---|---|---|
| 1. | "Decay" | 1:27 |
| 2. | "Comatose" | 3:58 |
| 3. | "Porcelain" | 3:41 |
| 4. | "Disillusionist" | 4:12 |
| 5. | "Elysium" | 1:27 |
| 6. | "Demons" | 4:19 |

== Reception ==
Professional ratings
Review scores
| Source | Rating |
|---|---|
| Big Cheese | 7/10 |
| Hit the Floor | 3.5/5 stars |
| Ramzine | 10/10 |
| Rock Regeneration | favourable |
| Ringmaster | 8.5/10 |
| Soundscape | 8/10 stars |
| Wolves Media | 10/10 |

The album was received positively by critics.

Ramzine and Wolves Media gave the EP a maximum score of 10/10. Wolves Media stated in their review that ' In the world of metalcore/hardcore, there aren’t too many bands that do it for me quite like From Her Eyes, one of South Wales’ best up and coming bands...This EP breaks new ground and will undoubtedly help From Her Eyes establish themselves as one of the defining metalcore bands of this generation. A masterpiece is an understatement.'

Soundscape also commented on the bands potential in progression in the British metal scene in their 8/10 review, stating that 'The band are gonna go places, with obvious influences from architects and While She Sleeps, it’s easy to hear this band are going to follow in the footsteps of their fellow Welsh bands, Funeral For A Friend and Bullet For My Valentine. The band also sound a little bit like Dream On, Dreamer. Overall a musically impressive album.'

== Personnel ==
=== From Her Eyes ===
- Tomas Morgan - Lead Vocals
- James Kearle - Lead Guitars, Rhythm Guitars
- Jesse Simmonds - Bass Guitar
- Gary Holley - Drums

=== Additional personnel ===
- Lucas Woodland (Falling with Style) - Guest Vocals on "Demons", Backing Gang Vocals
- Nathan Campfield (Breathe in the Silence) - Backing Gang Vocals
- Jake Bowen (Breathe in the Silence) - Backing Gang Vocals
- Jonny Renshaw (Devil Sold His Soul / Bandit Studios) - Recording, Engineering, Mixing & Mastering
- NATURMYSTIK - Artwork Photography
- James Kearle - Artwork Editing
- Jesse Simmonds - Artwork Editing
