= Daemonic (novel) =

Novel by Stephen Laws

First edition

Daemonic is a novel by Stephen Laws published by Hodder & Stoughton in 1995.

== Plot summary ==
Daemonic is a novel in which reclusive business tycoon and horror movie producer Jack Draegerman offers a large amount of money to a group of people to visit him in his mansion.

== Reception ==
Jonathan Palmer reviewed Daemonic for Arcane magazine, rating it a 3 out of 10 overall. Palmer comments that "Daemonic is the name of the book you should avoid. Diabolical might have been more apt." Reviewing the novel for The Agony Column, Rick Kleffel described Daemonic as "a complex combination of subtle thought and over-the-top horror, a crowd-pleaser, a perfect B-movie rendered with consummate skill as a high-class piece of writing."

== Reviews ==
- Review by Stephen Payne (1996) in Vector 189, p30
