= Daimonic =

Concept referring to certain motivational forces

The idea of the daimonic typically means quite a few things: from befitting a demon and fiendish, to be motivated by a spiritual force or genius and inspired. As a psychological term, it has come to represent an elemental force which contains an irrepressible drive towards individuation. As a literary term, it can also mean the dynamic unrest that exists in us all that forces us into the unknown, leading to self-destruction and/or self-discovery.

== Etymology ==
The term is derived from Greek "δαίμων" (daimon, gen. daimonos): "lesser god, guiding spirit, tutelary deity", by way of Latin dæmon: "spirit". "Daimon" itself is thought to be derived from daiomai, with the meaning of to divide or to lacerate. Marie-Louise von Franz delineated the term daiomai (see ref.), and indicates that its usage is specifically when someone perceived an occurrence which they attributed to the influence of a divine presence: amongst the examples provided by Franz are attributing to a daimon the occurrence of a horse becoming or being startled.

== History of usage ==
For the Minoan (3000-1100 BC) and Mycenaean (1500-1100 BC), "daimons" were seen as attendants or servants to the deities, possessing spiritual power. Later, the term "daimon" was used by writers such as Homer (8th century BC), Hesiod, and Plato as a synonym for theos, or god. Some scholars suggest a distinction between the terms: whereas theos was the personification of a god (e.g. Zeus), daimon referred to something indeterminate, invisible, incorporeal, and unknown.

During the period in which Homer was alive, people believed ailments were both caused and cured by daimons.

Heraclitus Of Ephesus, who was born about 540 B.C., wrote:

ēthos anthropōi daimōn

— Diels fragment 119 (in Agamben & Heller-Roazen 1999)

which is translated as, the character (ēthos) of a human (anthropōi) is the daimōn, or sometimes the character of a person is Fate, and the variation An individuals character is their fate (idem "Man's character is his fate").

Aeschylus mentions the term daimon in his play Agemmemnon, written during 458 B.C.

Socrates thought the daimones to be gods or the children of gods.

The pre-Socratic Greek philosopher Empedocles (5th century BC) later employed the term in describing the psyche or soul. Similarly, those such as Plutarch (1st century AD) suggested a view of the daimon as being an amorphous mental phenomenon, an occasion of mortals to come in contact with a great spiritual power. Plutarch wrote De genio Socratis.

The earliest pre-Christian conception of daimons or daimones also considered them ambiguous—not exclusively evil. But while daimons may have initially been seen as potentially good and evil, constructive and destructive, left to each man to relate to—the term eventually came to embody a purely evil connotation, with Xenocrates perhaps being one of the first to popularize this colloquial use. One scholar having claimed this elaborates in an interview:

The daimonic (unlike the demonic, which is merely destructive) is as much concerned with creativity as with negative reactions.
A special characteristic of the daimonic model is that it considers both creativity on one side, and anger and rage on the other side, as coming from the same source. That is, constructiveness and destructiveness have the same source in human personality. The source is simply human potential … The more conflict, the more rage, the more anxiety there is, the more the inner necessity to create. We must also bear in mind that gifted individuals, those with a genius (incidentally, genius was the Latin word for daimon, the basis of the daimonic concept) for certain things, feel this inner necessity even more intensely, and in some respects experience and give voice not only to their own demons but the collective daimonic as well.
So they are kind of like little oracles of Delphi, or canaries in a coal mine, sensing the dangers, the conflicts, the cultural shadow, and trying to give it some meaningful expression. Who wouldn't be a little neurotic having that kind of responsibility? But, as Freud recognized, we're all neurotic to some degree. And as Jung once said, we all have complexes. That is not the question. The only question is whether we have complexes or they have us.

== Psychology ==
In psychology, the daimonic refers to a natural human impulse within everyone to affirm, assert, perpetuate, and increase the self to its complete totality. If each Self undergoes a process of individuation, an involuntary and natural development towards individual maturity and harmony with collective human nature, then its driver is the daimonic, the force which seeks to overcome the obstacles to development, whatever the cost—both guide and guardian. Rollo May writes that the daimonic is "any natural function which has the power to take over the whole person... The daimonic can be either creative or destructive, but it is normally both... The daimonic is obviously not an entity but refers to a fundamental, archetypal function of human experience -- an existential reality". The daimonic is seen as an essentially undifferentiated, impersonal, primal force of nature which arises from the ground of being rather than the self as such.

The demands of the daimonic force upon the individual can be unorthodox, frightening, and overwhelming. With its obligation to protect the complete maturation of the individual and the unification of opposing forces within the Self, the inner urge can come in the form of a sudden journey (either intentional or serendipitous), a psychological illness, or simply neurotic and off-center behavior. Jung writes, "The daimon throws us down, makes us traitors to our ideals and cherished convictions — traitors to the selves we thought we were." Ultimately, it is the will of man to achieve his humanity, but since parts of his humanity may be deemed unacceptable and disowned, its demands are too often resisted. It is no wonder Yeats described it as that "other Will". Confrontation with the daimonic can be considered similar to "shadow-work".

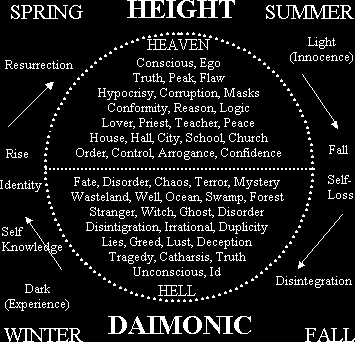
Common threads of the daimonic concept

The psychologist Rollo May conceives of the daimonic as a primal force of nature which contains both constructive and destructive potentialities, but ultimately seeks to promote totality of the self. May introduced the daimonic to psychology as a concept designed to rival the terms 'devil' and 'demonic'. He believed the term demonic to be unsatisfactory because of our tendency, rooted in Judeo-Christian mythology, to project power outside of the self and onto devils and demons. The daimonic is also similar to Jung's shadow, but is viewed as less differentiated. A pitfall of the Jungian doctrine of the shadow is the temptation to project evil onto this relatively autonomous 'splinter personality' and thus unnecessarily fragment the individual and obviate freedom and responsibility. Finally, by comparison to Freud's death instinct (Thanatos), the daimonic is seen as less one-sided.

While similar to several other psychological terms, noteworthy differences exist. The daimonic is often improperly confused with the term demonic.

== In literature ==
The journey from innocence to experience is not an idea that originated with this term; rather the Hero's Journey is a topic older than literature itself. But the daimonic subsequently became a focus of Romantic movement in the 18th and 19th centuries.

In the diagram (see psychology section above), the common threads of the daimonic concept are identified. Typically, the daimonic tale centers around the Solitary, the central character of the story, who usually is introduced in innocence, wealth, and often arrogance. However, under the masks of control and order lies a corruption and unconscious desire towards disintegration. Some event, either external or internal, leads the character towards some type of isolation where he is forced to confront his daimons.

The fall or descent (from hubris) into the liminal world where light and dark meet is usually very dramatic and often torturing for the hero and the audience alike, and comes in myriad forms. In the depths, in hitting bottom, he ultimately discovers his own fate and tragedy (catharsis), and in a final climax is either broken or driven towards rebirth and self-knowledge. The glory of the daimonic is in humble resurrection, though it claims more than it sets free as many foolish men are drawn into its vacuum never to return. As Stefan Zweig writes, the hero is unique for "he becomes the daimon's master instead of the daimon's thrall". The daimonic has been, and continues to be, a great source of creativity, inspiration, and fascination in all forms of art.

== See also ==
- Qi
- Collective unconscious
- Élan vital
- Libido
- Shadow (psychology)
- Thanatos (psychoanalysis)
