= List of minor planets: 577001–578000 =

The following is a partial list of minor planets, running from minor-planet number 577001 through 578000, inclusive. The primary data for this and other partial lists is based on JPL's "Small-Body Orbital Elements" and data available from the Minor Planet Center. Critical list information is also provided by the MPC, unless otherwise specified from Lowell Observatory. A detailed description of the table's columns and additional sources are given on the main page including a complete list of every page in this series, and a statistical break-up on the dynamical classification of minor planets.

Also see the summary list of all named bodies in numerical and alphabetical order, and the corresponding naming citations for the number range of this particular list. New namings may only be added to this list after official publication, as the preannouncement of names is condemned by the Working Group for Small Bodies Nomenclature of the International Astronomical Union.

Near-Earth obj.	MBA (inner)	MBA (outer)	Centaur
Mars-crosser	MBA (middle)	Jupiter trojan	Trans-Neptunian obj.
Unclassified

== 577001–577100 ==
Designation			Discovery			Properties		Ref
Permanent	Provisional	Named after	Date	Site	Discoverer(s)	Category	Diam.	Ref
577001	2012 XS_{132}	—	November 18, 2006	Kitt Peak	Spacewatch	·	4.3 km	MPC · JPL
577002	2012 XP_{137}	—	November 18, 2001	Apache Point	SDSS	·	2.5 km	MPC · JPL
577003	2012 XC_{139}	—	September 25, 2006	Catalina	CSS	·	3.9 km	MPC · JPL
577004	2012 XS_{140}	—	January 14, 2008	Kitt Peak	Spacewatch	HYG	2.8 km	MPC · JPL
577005	2012 XW_{141}	—	December 3, 2012	Mount Lemmon	Mount Lemmon Survey	·	2.4 km	MPC · JPL
577006	2012 XJ_{142}	—	December 6, 2012	Nogales	M. Schwartz, P. R. Holvorcem	·	1.8 km	MPC · JPL
577007	2012 XG_{144}	—	January 12, 2008	Kitt Peak	Spacewatch	·	2.2 km	MPC · JPL
577008	2012 XO_{145}	—	December 3, 2012	Mount Lemmon	Mount Lemmon Survey	·	2.2 km	MPC · JPL
577009	2012 XT_{145}	—	December 4, 2012	Mount Lemmon	Mount Lemmon Survey	·	1.7 km	MPC · JPL
577010	2012 XA_{148}	—	April 14, 2004	Kitt Peak	Spacewatch	·	3.4 km	MPC · JPL
577011	2012 XS_{149}	—	December 30, 2007	Kitt Peak	Spacewatch	·	3.0 km	MPC · JPL
577012	2012 XP_{152}	—	December 13, 2012	Kitt Peak	Spacewatch	·	3.7 km	MPC · JPL
577013	2012 XU_{153}	—	October 5, 2002	Palomar	NEAT	BRA	1.6 km	MPC · JPL
577014	2012 XA_{154}	—	September 11, 2007	Mount Lemmon	Mount Lemmon Survey	(5)	1.4 km	MPC · JPL
577015	2012 XG_{154}	—	October 15, 2001	Palomar	NEAT	TEL	1.9 km	MPC · JPL
577016	2012 XO_{155}	—	February 8, 2008	Catalina	CSS	·	2.8 km	MPC · JPL
577017	2012 XQ_{158}	—	February 12, 2008	Mount Lemmon	Mount Lemmon Survey	·	3.1 km	MPC · JPL
577018	2012 XT_{158}	—	December 4, 2012	Mount Lemmon	Mount Lemmon Survey	·	570 m	MPC · JPL
577019	2012 XA_{160}	—	December 9, 2012	Piszkéstető	K. Sárneczky	·	3.3 km	MPC · JPL
577020	2012 XF_{160}	—	March 22, 2003	Palomar	NEAT	·	4.3 km	MPC · JPL
577021	2012 XL_{160}	—	February 24, 2014	Haleakala	Pan-STARRS 1	EOS	1.4 km	MPC · JPL
577022	2012 XO_{160}	—	April 9, 2014	Kitt Peak	Spacewatch	·	490 m	MPC · JPL
577023	2012 XN_{165}	—	November 19, 2016	Mount Lemmon	Mount Lemmon Survey	·	990 m	MPC · JPL
577024	2012 XR_{165}	—	February 10, 2014	Haleakala	Pan-STARRS 1	·	2.2 km	MPC · JPL
577025	2012 XS_{165}	—	February 26, 2014	Mount Lemmon	Mount Lemmon Survey	EOS	1.6 km	MPC · JPL
577026	2012 XC_{167}	—	January 31, 2014	Haleakala	Pan-STARRS 1	EOS	1.5 km	MPC · JPL
577027	2012 XF_{169}	—	December 3, 2012	Mount Lemmon	Mount Lemmon Survey	EOS	1.4 km	MPC · JPL
577028	2012 XQ_{169}	—	December 4, 2012	Mount Lemmon	Mount Lemmon Survey	EOS	1.6 km	MPC · JPL
577029	2012 XC_{170}	—	December 3, 2012	Mount Lemmon	Mount Lemmon Survey	·	1.7 km	MPC · JPL
577030	2012 XA_{171}	—	December 2, 2012	Mount Lemmon	Mount Lemmon Survey	·	2.4 km	MPC · JPL
577031	2012 XO_{174}	—	December 11, 2012	Mount Lemmon	Mount Lemmon Survey	·	2.5 km	MPC · JPL
577032	2012 YJ_{3}	—	November 13, 2012	Mount Lemmon	Mount Lemmon Survey	·	420 m	MPC · JPL
577033	2012 YV_{8}	—	December 21, 2012	Mount Lemmon	Mount Lemmon Survey	·	3.2 km	MPC · JPL
577034	2012 YL_{12}	—	August 2, 2016	Haleakala	Pan-STARRS 1	URS	2.7 km	MPC · JPL
577035	2012 YQ_{12}	—	December 23, 2012	Haleakala	Pan-STARRS 1	·	2.4 km	MPC · JPL
577036	2012 YX_{12}	—	December 23, 2012	Haleakala	Pan-STARRS 1	·	1.7 km	MPC · JPL
577037	2012 YQ_{13}	—	December 23, 2012	Haleakala	Pan-STARRS 1	·	2.3 km	MPC · JPL
577038	2012 YY_{13}	—	December 23, 2012	Haleakala	Pan-STARRS 1	·	2.2 km	MPC · JPL
577039	2012 YH_{14}	—	December 22, 2012	Haleakala	Pan-STARRS 1	H	340 m	MPC · JPL
577040	2012 YY_{17}	—	December 23, 2012	Haleakala	Pan-STARRS 1	·	2.5 km	MPC · JPL
577041	2012 YD_{18}	—	December 23, 2012	Haleakala	Pan-STARRS 1	·	2.6 km	MPC · JPL
577042	2012 YF_{18}	—	December 23, 2012	Haleakala	Pan-STARRS 1	LUT	2.9 km	MPC · JPL
577043	2012 YC_{19}	—	December 23, 2012	Haleakala	Pan-STARRS 1	·	2.3 km	MPC · JPL
577044	2012 YA_{20}	—	December 22, 2012	Haleakala	Pan-STARRS 1	·	1.9 km	MPC · JPL
577045	2012 YW_{20}	—	December 23, 2012	Haleakala	Pan-STARRS 1	·	1 km	MPC · JPL
577046	2013 AH_{2}	—	December 12, 2006	Palomar	NEAT	TIR	2.9 km	MPC · JPL
577047	2013 AT_{13}	—	January 3, 2013	Mount Lemmon	Mount Lemmon Survey	·	2.7 km	MPC · JPL
577048	2013 AV_{13}	—	January 3, 2013	Mount Lemmon	Mount Lemmon Survey	·	3.1 km	MPC · JPL
577049	2013 AE_{15}	—	November 7, 2012	Mount Lemmon	Mount Lemmon Survey	·	1.4 km	MPC · JPL
577050	2013 AK_{15}	—	January 3, 2013	Oukaïmeden	C. Rinner	·	1.5 km	MPC · JPL
577051	2013 AQ_{19}	—	February 11, 2008	Mount Lemmon	Mount Lemmon Survey	·	1.9 km	MPC · JPL
577052	2013 AX_{19}	—	October 23, 2011	Haleakala	Pan-STARRS 1	·	3.0 km	MPC · JPL
577053	2013 AK_{21}	—	January 3, 2013	Haleakala	Pan-STARRS 1	·	700 m	MPC · JPL
577054	2013 AL_{22}	—	January 5, 2013	Mount Lemmon	Mount Lemmon Survey	EOS	1.7 km	MPC · JPL
577055	2013 AF_{24}	—	September 17, 2006	Catalina	CSS	·	2.6 km	MPC · JPL
577056	2013 AP_{24}	—	December 21, 2006	Kitt Peak	L. H. Wasserman, M. W. Buie	·	920 m	MPC · JPL
577057	2013 AC_{27}	—	December 11, 2012	Mount Lemmon	Mount Lemmon Survey	·	2.9 km	MPC · JPL
577058	2013 AB_{28}	—	December 13, 2012	Kitt Peak	Spacewatch	·	2.8 km	MPC · JPL
577059	2013 AO_{29}	—	January 3, 2013	Haleakala	Pan-STARRS 1	L4	10 km	MPC · JPL
577060	2013 AY_{29}	—	January 7, 2013	Oukaïmeden	M. Ory	EOS	2.2 km	MPC · JPL
577061	2013 AG_{30}	—	October 31, 2011	Mount Lemmon	Mount Lemmon Survey	EOS	1.9 km	MPC · JPL
577062	2013 AT_{30}	—	August 24, 2011	Haleakala	Pan-STARRS 1	·	2.3 km	MPC · JPL
577063	2013 AK_{32}	—	November 13, 2012	Mount Lemmon	Mount Lemmon Survey	·	3.3 km	MPC · JPL
577064	2013 AU_{33}	—	February 11, 2008	Mount Lemmon	Mount Lemmon Survey	·	2.1 km	MPC · JPL
577065	2013 AS_{34}	—	January 4, 2013	Mount Lemmon	Mount Lemmon Survey	·	1.6 km	MPC · JPL
577066	2013 AV_{35}	—	December 23, 2012	Haleakala	Pan-STARRS 1	VER	2.5 km	MPC · JPL
577067	2013 AZ_{35}	—	September 27, 2012	Haleakala	Pan-STARRS 1	L4	8.4 km	MPC · JPL
577068	2013 AB_{36}	—	December 19, 2001	Socorro	LINEAR	·	990 m	MPC · JPL
577069	2013 AF_{36}	—	January 5, 2013	Kitt Peak	Spacewatch	·	600 m	MPC · JPL
577070	2013 AH_{36}	—	November 5, 2010	Mount Lemmon	Mount Lemmon Survey	L4	8.1 km	MPC · JPL
577071	2013 AF_{43}	—	January 5, 2013	Kitt Peak	Spacewatch	·	1.0 km	MPC · JPL
577072	2013 AZ_{43}	—	September 23, 2011	Haleakala	Pan-STARRS 1	·	1.8 km	MPC · JPL
577073	2013 AA_{46}	—	February 7, 2002	Palomar	NEAT	·	3.4 km	MPC · JPL
577074	2013 AT_{46}	—	January 6, 2013	Mount Lemmon	Mount Lemmon Survey	·	2.3 km	MPC · JPL
577075	2013 AX_{46}	—	January 19, 2008	Mount Lemmon	Mount Lemmon Survey	EOS	2.1 km	MPC · JPL
577076	2013 AC_{47}	—	January 6, 2013	Mount Lemmon	Mount Lemmon Survey	·	1.6 km	MPC · JPL
577077	2013 AL_{48}	—	December 21, 2012	Catalina	CSS	·	3.3 km	MPC · JPL
577078	2013 AA_{52}	—	October 19, 2011	Mount Lemmon	Mount Lemmon Survey	·	2.5 km	MPC · JPL
577079	2013 AT_{52}	—	September 30, 2011	Kitt Peak	Spacewatch	·	3.1 km	MPC · JPL
577080	2013 AA_{54}	—	December 19, 2007	Kitt Peak	Spacewatch	·	2.0 km	MPC · JPL
577081	2013 AS_{55}	—	December 23, 2012	Haleakala	Pan-STARRS 1	·	2.8 km	MPC · JPL
577082	2013 AP_{61}	—	October 15, 2001	Apache Point	SDSS	·	1.9 km	MPC · JPL
577083	2013 AY_{68}	—	August 26, 2005	Palomar	NEAT	·	630 m	MPC · JPL
577084	2013 AE_{70}	—	January 3, 2013	Mount Lemmon	Mount Lemmon Survey	·	2.9 km	MPC · JPL
577085	2013 AF_{71}	—	December 1, 2005	Kitt Peak	Wasserman, L. H., Millis, R. L.	·	750 m	MPC · JPL
577086	2013 AP_{71}	—	November 20, 2001	Socorro	LINEAR	·	2.1 km	MPC · JPL
577087	2013 AF_{72}	—	October 10, 1996	Kitt Peak	Spacewatch	·	1.4 km	MPC · JPL
577088	2013 AN_{72}	—	January 5, 2013	Mount Lemmon	Mount Lemmon Survey	·	1.8 km	MPC · JPL
577089	2013 AB_{73}	—	February 10, 2008	Kitt Peak	Spacewatch	·	2.8 km	MPC · JPL
577090	2013 AR_{73}	—	January 5, 2002	Anderson Mesa	LONEOS	·	3.0 km	MPC · JPL
577091	2013 AF_{74}	—	April 20, 2010	Mount Lemmon	Mount Lemmon Survey	·	650 m	MPC · JPL
577092	2013 AZ_{75}	—	November 23, 2012	Kitt Peak	Spacewatch	·	3.2 km	MPC · JPL
577093	2013 AF_{76}	—	January 5, 2013	Catalina	CSS	T_{j} (2.88)	4.7 km	MPC · JPL
577094	2013 AW_{77}	—	December 23, 2012	Haleakala	Pan-STARRS 1	EOS	1.6 km	MPC · JPL
577095	2013 AF_{78}	—	January 3, 2013	Haleakala	Pan-STARRS 1	EUP	2.9 km	MPC · JPL
577096	2013 AD_{79}	—	February 6, 2002	Anderson Mesa	LONEOS	·	3.8 km	MPC · JPL
577097	2013 AJ_{79}	—	January 5, 2013	Mount Lemmon	Mount Lemmon Survey	NYS	720 m	MPC · JPL
577098	2013 AK_{81}	—	January 5, 2003	Kitt Peak	Spacewatch	·	1.9 km	MPC · JPL
577099	2013 AP_{82}	—	January 12, 2013	Mount Lemmon	Mount Lemmon Survey	·	2.7 km	MPC · JPL
577100	2013 AR_{84}	—	September 3, 2010	Mount Lemmon	Mount Lemmon Survey	·	2.7 km	MPC · JPL

== 577101–577200 ==
back to top

Designation			Discovery			Properties		Ref
Permanent	Provisional	Named after	Date	Site	Discoverer(s)	Category	Diam.	Ref
577101	2013 AG_{86}	—	December 14, 2012	ESA OGS	ESA OGS	·	2.4 km	MPC · JPL
577102	2013 AH_{86}	—	December 23, 2012	Haleakala	Pan-STARRS 1	·	810 m	MPC · JPL
577103	2013 AT_{86}	—	December 17, 2012	ESA OGS	ESA OGS	·	1.6 km	MPC · JPL
577104	2013 AA_{87}	—	December 23, 2012	Haleakala	Pan-STARRS 1	·	2.5 km	MPC · JPL
577105	2013 AD_{87}	—	January 13, 2013	Mount Lemmon	Mount Lemmon Survey	·	740 m	MPC · JPL
577106	2013 AA_{89}	—	February 3, 2002	Palomar	NEAT	·	2.9 km	MPC · JPL
577107	2013 AA_{92}	—	December 23, 2012	Haleakala	Pan-STARRS 1	·	2.7 km	MPC · JPL
577108	2013 AD_{92}	—	December 23, 2006	Bergisch Gladbach	W. Bickel	EUP	3.7 km	MPC · JPL
577109	2013 AN_{94}	—	December 23, 2012	Haleakala	Pan-STARRS 1	·	2.3 km	MPC · JPL
577110	2013 AH_{95}	—	November 18, 2007	Mount Lemmon	Mount Lemmon Survey	TEL	1.4 km	MPC · JPL
577111	2013 AR_{101}	—	December 22, 2012	Calar Alto-CASADO	Mottola, S.	·	2.0 km	MPC · JPL
577112	2013 AQ_{102}	—	May 15, 2005	Mount Lemmon	Mount Lemmon Survey	URS	3.4 km	MPC · JPL
577113	2013 AU_{105}	—	September 7, 2011	Kitt Peak	Spacewatch	EMA	2.6 km	MPC · JPL
577114	2013 AX_{105}	—	January 10, 2013	Haleakala	Pan-STARRS 1	·	2.3 km	MPC · JPL
577115	2013 AB_{106}	—	January 10, 2013	Haleakala	Pan-STARRS 1	VER	1.9 km	MPC · JPL
577116	2013 AX_{107}	—	July 29, 2008	Kitt Peak	Spacewatch	·	520 m	MPC · JPL
577117	2013 AU_{108}	—	October 23, 2003	Kitt Peak	Spacewatch	·	1.0 km	MPC · JPL
577118	2013 AM_{111}	—	January 12, 2013	Bergisch Gladbach	W. Bickel	·	2.1 km	MPC · JPL
577119	2013 AD_{112}	—	September 27, 2012	Haleakala	Pan-STARRS 1	·	2.8 km	MPC · JPL
577120	2013 AG_{114}	—	September 23, 2011	Kitt Peak	Spacewatch	·	2.6 km	MPC · JPL
577121	2013 AM_{114}	—	January 13, 2013	Mount Lemmon	Mount Lemmon Survey	·	750 m	MPC · JPL
577122	2013 AO_{114}	—	July 31, 2005	Palomar	NEAT	·	3.0 km	MPC · JPL
577123	2013 AS_{114}	—	January 13, 2013	Mount Lemmon	Mount Lemmon Survey	·	2.2 km	MPC · JPL
577124	2013 AH_{115}	—	January 3, 2013	Mount Lemmon	Mount Lemmon Survey	·	2.3 km	MPC · JPL
577125	2013 AQ_{115}	—	January 21, 2002	Kitt Peak	Spacewatch	·	3.0 km	MPC · JPL
577126	2013 AE_{119}	—	December 16, 2012	ESA OGS	ESA OGS	·	2.6 km	MPC · JPL
577127	2013 AG_{119}	—	December 21, 2012	Mount Lemmon	Mount Lemmon Survey	·	650 m	MPC · JPL
577128	2013 AS_{119}	—	December 23, 2012	Haleakala	Pan-STARRS 1	·	3.7 km	MPC · JPL
577129	2013 AJ_{120}	—	January 13, 2013	ESA OGS	ESA OGS	·	2.6 km	MPC · JPL
577130	2013 AO_{120}	—	January 13, 2013	ESA OGS	ESA OGS	EOS	1.5 km	MPC · JPL
577131	2013 AJ_{121}	—	March 23, 2003	Drebach	Drebach	·	640 m	MPC · JPL
577132	2013 AR_{121}	—	December 23, 2012	Haleakala	Pan-STARRS 1	·	3.0 km	MPC · JPL
577133	2013 AD_{122}	—	December 23, 2001	Kitt Peak	Spacewatch	EOS	2.3 km	MPC · JPL
577134	2013 AC_{123}	—	January 6, 2013	Kitt Peak	Spacewatch	·	2.8 km	MPC · JPL
577135	2013 AG_{125}	—	January 15, 2013	ESA OGS	ESA OGS	·	830 m	MPC · JPL
577136	2013 AZ_{126}	—	January 3, 2013	Mount Lemmon	Mount Lemmon Survey	·	2.8 km	MPC · JPL
577137	2013 AF_{128}	—	November 17, 2006	Mount Lemmon	Mount Lemmon Survey	·	2.4 km	MPC · JPL
577138	2013 AZ_{128}	—	October 23, 2006	Kitt Peak	Spacewatch	·	2.4 km	MPC · JPL
577139	2013 AL_{129}	—	June 21, 2007	Mount Lemmon	Mount Lemmon Survey	L4	10 km	MPC · JPL
577140	2013 AL_{135}	—	January 5, 2013	Charleston	R. Holmes	L4	8.3 km	MPC · JPL
577141	2013 AX_{139}	—	May 4, 2005	Mount Lemmon	Mount Lemmon Survey	·	1.9 km	MPC · JPL
577142	2013 AF_{147}	—	January 4, 2013	Cerro Tololo-DECam	DECam	·	1.1 km	MPC · JPL
577143	2013 AQ_{150}	—	January 4, 2013	Cerro Tololo-DECam	DECam	·	2.2 km	MPC · JPL
577144	2013 AB_{151}	—	August 30, 2005	Kitt Peak	Spacewatch	EOS	1.6 km	MPC · JPL
577145	2013 AX_{151}	—	January 4, 2013	Cerro Tololo-DECam	DECam	EOS	1.5 km	MPC · JPL
577146	2013 AD_{152}	—	September 28, 2011	Kitt Peak	Spacewatch	·	1.4 km	MPC · JPL
577147	2013 AO_{153}	—	April 1, 2003	Apache Point	SDSS Collaboration	·	2.3 km	MPC · JPL
577148	2013 AC_{156}	—	October 24, 2011	Haleakala	Pan-STARRS 1	·	2.4 km	MPC · JPL
577149	2013 AH_{156}	—	January 20, 2013	Mount Lemmon	Mount Lemmon Survey	·	2.2 km	MPC · JPL
577150	2013 AU_{156}	—	October 20, 2011	Kitt Peak	Spacewatch	·	2.2 km	MPC · JPL
577151	2013 AE_{157}	—	February 10, 2013	Haleakala	Pan-STARRS 1	EOS	1.3 km	MPC · JPL
577152	2013 AO_{157}	—	February 29, 2008	Kitt Peak	Spacewatch	·	2.3 km	MPC · JPL
577153	2013 AS_{161}	—	September 11, 2005	Kitt Peak	Spacewatch	EOS	1.7 km	MPC · JPL
577154	2013 AZ_{161}	—	January 21, 2013	Mount Lemmon	Mount Lemmon Survey	·	2.5 km	MPC · JPL
577155	2013 AA_{162}	—	October 18, 2011	Kitt Peak	Spacewatch	·	2.3 km	MPC · JPL
577156	2013 AH_{162}	—	August 31, 2005	Kitt Peak	Spacewatch	EOS	1.6 km	MPC · JPL
577157	2013 AV_{163}	—	January 20, 2013	Mount Lemmon	Mount Lemmon Survey	LIX	2.1 km	MPC · JPL
577158	2013 AE_{167}	—	January 4, 2013	Cerro Tololo-DECam	DECam	VER	2.3 km	MPC · JPL
577159	2013 AJ_{167}	—	September 23, 2008	Kitt Peak	Spacewatch	·	560 m	MPC · JPL
577160	2013 AM_{167}	—	September 29, 2005	Kitt Peak	Spacewatch	·	2.3 km	MPC · JPL
577161	2013 AY_{168}	—	January 17, 2013	Haleakala	Pan-STARRS 1	EUP	2.5 km	MPC · JPL
577162	2013 AF_{169}	—	October 21, 2011	Kitt Peak	Spacewatch	·	2.5 km	MPC · JPL
577163	2013 AG_{169}	—	January 4, 2013	Cerro Tololo-DECam	DECam	EOS	1.4 km	MPC · JPL
577164	2013 AK_{169}	—	January 4, 2013	Cerro Tololo-DECam	DECam	·	2.3 km	MPC · JPL
577165	2013 AC_{171}	—	October 24, 2011	Haleakala	Pan-STARRS 1	·	2.1 km	MPC · JPL
577166	2013 AF_{173}	—	February 1, 2009	Mount Lemmon	Mount Lemmon Survey	·	1.3 km	MPC · JPL
577167	2013 AU_{178}	—	January 5, 2013	Cerro Tololo-DECam	DECam	·	2.6 km	MPC · JPL
577168	2013 AY_{181}	—	January 18, 2013	Haleakala	Pan-STARRS 1	·	1.7 km	MPC · JPL
577169	2013 AT_{184}	—	October 4, 2011	Piszkés-tető	K. Sárneczky, S. Kürti	EOS	2.0 km	MPC · JPL
577170	2013 AA_{185}	—	October 23, 2006	Kitt Peak	Spacewatch	THM	1.8 km	MPC · JPL
577171	2013 AD_{189}	—	January 6, 2013	Kitt Peak	Spacewatch	·	1.6 km	MPC · JPL
577172	2013 AV_{192}	—	February 24, 2014	Haleakala	Pan-STARRS 1	·	2.1 km	MPC · JPL
577173	2013 AA_{193}	—	February 24, 2014	Haleakala	Pan-STARRS 1	TEL	1.1 km	MPC · JPL
577174	2013 AF_{195}	—	May 18, 2015	Mount Lemmon	Mount Lemmon Survey	EOS	1.5 km	MPC · JPL
577175	2013 AM_{197}	—	January 7, 2013	Kitt Peak	Spacewatch	MRX	820 m	MPC · JPL
577176	2013 AW_{197}	—	January 10, 2013	Haleakala	Pan-STARRS 1	(31811)	2.1 km	MPC · JPL
577177	2013 AM_{199}	—	January 10, 2013	Haleakala	Pan-STARRS 1	L4	7.2 km	MPC · JPL
577178	2013 BZ_{4}	—	September 17, 2001	Anderson Mesa	LONEOS	·	2.2 km	MPC · JPL
577179	2013 BD_{6}	—	November 16, 2006	Kitt Peak	Spacewatch	·	2.6 km	MPC · JPL
577180	2013 BM_{6}	—	February 9, 2008	Mount Lemmon	Mount Lemmon Survey	·	2.5 km	MPC · JPL
577181	2013 BB_{7}	—	July 31, 2011	Haleakala	Pan-STARRS 1	·	740 m	MPC · JPL
577182	2013 BX_{7}	—	August 30, 2005	Kitt Peak	Spacewatch	·	2.7 km	MPC · JPL
577183	2013 BY_{7}	—	October 22, 2006	Catalina	CSS	EOS	1.8 km	MPC · JPL
577184	2013 BR_{10}	—	January 5, 2013	Kitt Peak	Spacewatch	EOS	1.5 km	MPC · JPL
577185	2013 BV_{13}	—	February 9, 2008	Mount Lemmon	Mount Lemmon Survey	·	2.7 km	MPC · JPL
577186	2013 BG_{14}	—	January 4, 2013	Mount Lemmon	Mount Lemmon Survey	·	610 m	MPC · JPL
577187	2013 BM_{14}	—	September 26, 2006	Kitt Peak	Spacewatch	·	2.8 km	MPC · JPL
577188	2013 BV_{16}	—	July 29, 2008	Mount Lemmon	Mount Lemmon Survey	L4 · ERY	7.2 km	MPC · JPL
577189	2013 BD_{17}	—	July 29, 2008	Kitt Peak	Spacewatch	L4 · ERY	6.9 km	MPC · JPL
577190	2013 BH_{20}	—	March 11, 2008	Kitt Peak	Spacewatch	·	2.8 km	MPC · JPL
577191	2013 BY_{21}	—	September 24, 2011	Haleakala	Pan-STARRS 1	EOS	1.6 km	MPC · JPL
577192	2013 BA_{22}	—	September 18, 2011	Mount Lemmon	Mount Lemmon Survey	·	1.2 km	MPC · JPL
577193	2013 BJ_{23}	—	February 21, 2002	Kitt Peak	Spacewatch	·	3.2 km	MPC · JPL
577194	2013 BC_{24}	—	March 4, 2003	Saint-Véran	St. Veran	·	1.0 km	MPC · JPL
577195	2013 BS_{24}	—	February 13, 2002	Apache Point	SDSS Collaboration	·	3.2 km	MPC · JPL
577196	2013 BU_{25}	—	March 23, 2002	Kitt Peak	Spacewatch	·	3.1 km	MPC · JPL
577197	2013 BA_{29}	—	January 16, 2013	Mount Lemmon	Mount Lemmon Survey	·	550 m	MPC · JPL
577198	2013 BX_{31}	—	December 13, 2006	Kitt Peak	Spacewatch	VER	2.6 km	MPC · JPL
577199	2013 BE_{32}	—	October 19, 2006	Catalina	CSS	·	2.0 km	MPC · JPL
577200	2013 BO_{32}	—	December 12, 2006	Kitt Peak	Spacewatch	EOS	1.8 km	MPC · JPL

== 577201–577300 ==
back to top

Designation			Discovery			Properties		Ref
Permanent	Provisional	Named after	Date	Site	Discoverer(s)	Category	Diam.	Ref
577201	2013 BP_{33}	—	February 11, 2008	Mount Lemmon	Mount Lemmon Survey	VER	2.3 km	MPC · JPL
577202	2013 BX_{35}	—	January 17, 2013	Haleakala	Pan-STARRS 1	·	580 m	MPC · JPL
577203	2013 BT_{36}	—	December 23, 2012	Haleakala	Pan-STARRS 1	·	550 m	MPC · JPL
577204	2013 BE_{38}	—	July 31, 2005	Palomar	NEAT	·	2.8 km	MPC · JPL
577205	2013 BP_{41}	—	January 21, 2002	Kitt Peak	Spacewatch	·	740 m	MPC · JPL
577206	2013 BH_{48}	—	April 20, 2009	Kitt Peak	Spacewatch	·	2.6 km	MPC · JPL
577207	2013 BM_{48}	—	September 24, 2011	Haleakala	Pan-STARRS 1	VER	2.3 km	MPC · JPL
577208	2013 BM_{50}	—	January 16, 2013	Haleakala	Pan-STARRS 1	·	630 m	MPC · JPL
577209	2013 BQ_{50}	—	May 1, 2003	Kitt Peak	Spacewatch	·	3.3 km	MPC · JPL
577210	2013 BV_{50}	—	January 16, 2013	Haleakala	Pan-STARRS 1	L4	8.0 km	MPC · JPL
577211	2013 BX_{51}	—	January 10, 2008	Mount Lemmon	Mount Lemmon Survey	·	1.8 km	MPC · JPL
577212	2013 BA_{52}	—	January 16, 2013	Haleakala	Pan-STARRS 1	·	540 m	MPC · JPL
577213	2013 BN_{52}	—	January 16, 2013	Haleakala	Pan-STARRS 1	·	1.5 km	MPC · JPL
577214	2013 BQ_{52}	—	February 24, 2008	Mount Lemmon	Mount Lemmon Survey	EOS	1.9 km	MPC · JPL
577215	2013 BR_{52}	—	May 11, 2010	Mount Lemmon	Mount Lemmon Survey	·	600 m	MPC · JPL
577216	2013 BN_{53}	—	December 23, 2012	Haleakala	Pan-STARRS 1	MAS	530 m	MPC · JPL
577217	2013 BT_{53}	—	November 22, 2006	Kitt Peak	Spacewatch	·	2.5 km	MPC · JPL
577218	2013 BM_{54}	—	March 10, 2008	Kitt Peak	Spacewatch	·	3.2 km	MPC · JPL
577219	2013 BP_{55}	—	November 25, 2006	Kitt Peak	Spacewatch	EOS	2.0 km	MPC · JPL
577220	2013 BD_{56}	—	October 31, 2011	Mayhill-ISON	L. Elenin	·	2.7 km	MPC · JPL
577221	2013 BA_{57}	—	December 23, 2012	Haleakala	Pan-STARRS 1	URS	2.8 km	MPC · JPL
577222	2013 BF_{58}	—	August 23, 2001	Anderson Mesa	LONEOS	·	830 m	MPC · JPL
577223	2013 BL_{58}	—	February 10, 2008	Mount Lemmon	Mount Lemmon Survey	EOS	1.6 km	MPC · JPL
577224	2013 BU_{62}	—	January 9, 2013	Kitt Peak	Spacewatch	·	2.9 km	MPC · JPL
577225	2013 BF_{65}	—	February 28, 2008	Kitt Peak	Spacewatch	(1298)	2.9 km	MPC · JPL
577226	2013 BA_{67}	—	November 3, 2011	Kitt Peak	Spacewatch	·	3.1 km	MPC · JPL
577227	2013 BH_{67}	—	January 15, 2013	Catalina	CSS	·	540 m	MPC · JPL
577228	2013 BK_{67}	—	November 20, 2007	Mount Lemmon	Mount Lemmon Survey	·	3.6 km	MPC · JPL
577229	2013 BX_{67}	—	September 29, 2008	Mount Lemmon	Mount Lemmon Survey	·	670 m	MPC · JPL
577230	2013 BS_{68}	—	January 20, 2013	Kitt Peak	Spacewatch	·	2.7 km	MPC · JPL
577231	2013 BO_{70}	—	January 30, 2008	Mount Lemmon	Mount Lemmon Survey	·	2.4 km	MPC · JPL
577232	2013 BO_{71}	—	January 22, 2013	Kitt Peak	Spacewatch	·	3.2 km	MPC · JPL
577233	2013 BW_{72}	—	June 18, 2010	Mount Lemmon	Mount Lemmon Survey	EUN	1.3 km	MPC · JPL
577234	2013 BC_{73}	—	December 30, 2000	Kitt Peak	Spacewatch	L4	7.6 km	MPC · JPL
577235	2013 BX_{75}	—	January 31, 2013	Mount Lemmon	Mount Lemmon Survey	·	2.9 km	MPC · JPL
577236	2013 BL_{79}	—	April 2, 2006	Kitt Peak	Spacewatch	·	950 m	MPC · JPL
577237	2013 BJ_{85}	—	April 4, 2014	Mount Lemmon	Mount Lemmon Survey	VER	2.3 km	MPC · JPL
577238	2013 BK_{85}	—	January 16, 2013	Haleakala	Pan-STARRS 1	·	540 m	MPC · JPL
577239	2013 BU_{85}	—	April 6, 2014	Mount Lemmon	Mount Lemmon Survey	·	2.7 km	MPC · JPL
577240	2013 BX_{88}	—	June 24, 2015	Haleakala	Pan-STARRS 1	T_{j} (2.98)	2.7 km	MPC · JPL
577241	2013 BQ_{89}	—	October 24, 2011	Haleakala	Pan-STARRS 1	·	1.9 km	MPC · JPL
577242	2013 BY_{89}	—	June 26, 2015	Haleakala	Pan-STARRS 1	·	1.5 km	MPC · JPL
577243	2013 BH_{92}	—	January 19, 2013	Kitt Peak	Spacewatch	·	500 m	MPC · JPL
577244	2013 BX_{92}	—	January 31, 2013	Kitt Peak	Spacewatch	·	530 m	MPC · JPL
577245	2013 BR_{93}	—	January 22, 2013	Mount Lemmon	Mount Lemmon Survey	·	560 m	MPC · JPL
577246	2013 BH_{95}	—	January 20, 2013	Kitt Peak	Spacewatch	·	2.7 km	MPC · JPL
577247	2013 BO_{95}	—	January 19, 2013	Kitt Peak	Spacewatch	·	3.5 km	MPC · JPL
577248	2013 BZ_{97}	—	September 29, 2011	Charleston	R. Holmes	EOS	1.6 km	MPC · JPL
577249	2013 BO_{98}	—	January 17, 2013	Haleakala	Pan-STARRS 1	·	570 m	MPC · JPL
577250	2013 CJ	—	February 7, 2002	Palomar	NEAT	·	1.5 km	MPC · JPL
577251	2013 CP_{5}	—	January 10, 2013	Haleakala	Pan-STARRS 1	·	2.3 km	MPC · JPL
577252	2013 CV_{6}	—	October 23, 2005	Palomar	NEAT	·	540 m	MPC · JPL
577253	2013 CC_{8}	—	December 7, 2001	Palomar	NEAT	·	1.9 km	MPC · JPL
577254	2013 CN_{8}	—	September 24, 2011	Haleakala	Pan-STARRS 1	·	2.1 km	MPC · JPL
577255	2013 CO_{8}	—	January 3, 2013	Mount Lemmon	Mount Lemmon Survey	·	3.3 km	MPC · JPL
577256	2013 CK_{9}	—	February 2, 2013	Haleakala	Pan-STARRS 1	·	950 m	MPC · JPL
577257	2013 CW_{9}	—	November 1, 2008	Mount Lemmon	Mount Lemmon Survey	NYS	750 m	MPC · JPL
577258	2013 CA_{12}	—	August 25, 2005	Palomar	NEAT	EOS	1.8 km	MPC · JPL
577259	2013 CJ_{19}	—	October 23, 2011	Mount Lemmon	Mount Lemmon Survey	·	3.1 km	MPC · JPL
577260	2013 CG_{21}	—	February 3, 2013	Haleakala	Pan-STARRS 1	EOS	1.6 km	MPC · JPL
577261	2013 CV_{23}	—	August 27, 2005	Palomar	NEAT	·	2.4 km	MPC · JPL
577262	2013 CW_{24}	—	August 10, 2010	Kitt Peak	Spacewatch	·	2.7 km	MPC · JPL
577263	2013 CN_{25}	—	February 3, 2013	Haleakala	Pan-STARRS 1	·	770 m	MPC · JPL
577264	2013 CC_{27}	—	February 3, 2013	Haleakala	Pan-STARRS 1	·	750 m	MPC · JPL
577265	2013 CH_{28}	—	February 5, 2013	Mount Lemmon	Mount Lemmon Survey	·	2.9 km	MPC · JPL
577266	2013 CO_{30}	—	February 5, 2013	Mount Lemmon	Mount Lemmon Survey	·	3.2 km	MPC · JPL
577267	2013 CV_{31}	—	January 5, 2013	Mount Lemmon	Mount Lemmon Survey	·	2.2 km	MPC · JPL
577268	2013 CA_{32}	—	January 6, 2002	Kitt Peak	Spacewatch	·	3.3 km	MPC · JPL
577269	2013 CW_{33}	—	January 10, 2013	Haleakala	Pan-STARRS 1	EOS	1.6 km	MPC · JPL
577270	2013 CT_{39}	—	March 16, 2002	Socorro	LINEAR	MAS	720 m	MPC · JPL
577271	2013 CN_{40}	—	November 2, 2011	Mount Lemmon	Mount Lemmon Survey	·	2.3 km	MPC · JPL
577272	2013 CY_{40}	—	December 15, 2001	Apache Point	SDSS Collaboration	EOS	1.9 km	MPC · JPL
577273	2013 CO_{43}	—	February 5, 2013	Kitt Peak	Spacewatch	·	2.5 km	MPC · JPL
577274	2013 CQ_{43}	—	January 5, 2013	Kitt Peak	Spacewatch	·	650 m	MPC · JPL
577275	2013 CA_{45}	—	November 2, 2011	Mount Lemmon	Mount Lemmon Survey	EOS	1.5 km	MPC · JPL
577276	2013 CL_{46}	—	February 5, 2013	Mount Lemmon	Mount Lemmon Survey	V	620 m	MPC · JPL
577277	2013 CJ_{48}	—	February 16, 2002	Palomar	NEAT	TIR	3.1 km	MPC · JPL
577278	2013 CD_{57}	—	February 8, 2013	Oukaïmeden	C. Rinner	EOS	1.8 km	MPC · JPL
577279	2013 CE_{60}	—	January 20, 2013	Kitt Peak	Spacewatch	·	1.8 km	MPC · JPL
577280	2013 CZ_{61}	—	December 17, 2001	Socorro	LINEAR	·	2.7 km	MPC · JPL
577281	2013 CC_{62}	—	January 8, 2013	Mount Lemmon	Mount Lemmon Survey	·	2.3 km	MPC · JPL
577282	2013 CN_{63}	—	July 30, 2005	Palomar	NEAT	EOS	2.3 km	MPC · JPL
577283	2013 CT_{63}	—	May 26, 2003	Nogales	P. R. Holvorcem, M. Schwartz	V	620 m	MPC · JPL
577284	2013 CB_{68}	—	February 6, 2013	Nogales	M. Schwartz, P. R. Holvorcem	·	1.3 km	MPC · JPL
577285	2013 CA_{70}	—	October 24, 2005	Mauna Kea	A. Boattini	·	1.3 km	MPC · JPL
577286	2013 CA_{72}	—	January 10, 2013	Haleakala	Pan-STARRS 1	·	3.0 km	MPC · JPL
577287	2013 CA_{75}	—	January 20, 2013	Mount Lemmon	Mount Lemmon Survey	·	3.0 km	MPC · JPL
577288	2013 CF_{76}	—	October 6, 2008	Kitt Peak	Spacewatch	·	690 m	MPC · JPL
577289	2013 CA_{79}	—	July 30, 2005	Palomar	NEAT	·	3.2 km	MPC · JPL
577290	2013 CD_{79}	—	January 19, 2013	Catalina	CSS	T_{j} (2.97)	3.1 km	MPC · JPL
577291	2013 CL_{80}	—	February 8, 2013	Nogales	M. Schwartz, P. R. Holvorcem	·	3.1 km	MPC · JPL
577292	2013 CB_{81}	—	October 7, 2005	Mount Lemmon	Mount Lemmon Survey	VER	2.5 km	MPC · JPL
577293	2013 CZ_{82}	—	December 3, 2008	Kitt Peak	Spacewatch	·	760 m	MPC · JPL
577294	2013 CC_{84}	—	February 5, 2013	Kitt Peak	Spacewatch	·	3.1 km	MPC · JPL
577295	2013 CG_{87}	—	February 10, 2013	Haleakala	Pan-STARRS 1	L4	9.8 km	MPC · JPL
577296	2013 CY_{90}	—	October 20, 2003	Kitt Peak	Spacewatch	ADE	1.7 km	MPC · JPL
577297	2013 CC_{92}	—	January 18, 2013	Kitt Peak	Spacewatch	·	1.1 km	MPC · JPL
577298	2013 CF_{93}	—	February 8, 2013	Haleakala	Pan-STARRS 1	·	2.3 km	MPC · JPL
577299	2013 CC_{96}	—	February 8, 2013	Haleakala	Pan-STARRS 1	·	1.5 km	MPC · JPL
577300	2013 CR_{98}	—	February 8, 2013	Haleakala	Pan-STARRS 1	·	1.4 km	MPC · JPL

== 577301–577400 ==
back to top

Designation			Discovery			Properties		Ref
Permanent	Provisional	Named after	Date	Site	Discoverer(s)	Category	Diam.	Ref
577301	2013 CE_{100}	—	February 10, 2007	Mount Lemmon	Mount Lemmon Survey	·	2.4 km	MPC · JPL
577302	2013 CM_{101}	—	September 28, 2008	Mount Lemmon	Mount Lemmon Survey	L4 · ERY	7.3 km	MPC · JPL
577303	2013 CE_{102}	—	October 1, 2008	Kitt Peak	Spacewatch	(2076)	520 m	MPC · JPL
577304	2013 CB_{106}	—	August 12, 2010	Kitt Peak	Spacewatch	·	2.5 km	MPC · JPL
577305	2013 CC_{106}	—	September 4, 2011	Haleakala	Pan-STARRS 1	·	910 m	MPC · JPL
577306	2013 CM_{106}	—	February 9, 2013	Haleakala	Pan-STARRS 1	·	3.1 km	MPC · JPL
577307	2013 CD_{107}	—	July 12, 2005	Mount Lemmon	Mount Lemmon Survey	·	2.6 km	MPC · JPL
577308	2013 CO_{107}	—	September 15, 2010	Mount Lemmon	Mount Lemmon Survey	·	3.2 km	MPC · JPL
577309	2013 CC_{108}	—	January 31, 2006	Kitt Peak	Spacewatch	·	610 m	MPC · JPL
577310	2013 CP_{109}	—	January 19, 2013	Kitt Peak	Spacewatch	·	3.1 km	MPC · JPL
577311	2013 CT_{111}	—	January 28, 2007	Mount Lemmon	Mount Lemmon Survey	VER	2.4 km	MPC · JPL
577312	2013 CH_{112}	—	January 20, 2013	Kitt Peak	Spacewatch	EOS	1.5 km	MPC · JPL
577313	2013 CM_{112}	—	February 9, 2013	Haleakala	Pan-STARRS 1	·	510 m	MPC · JPL
577314	2013 CK_{114}	—	October 11, 2005	Kitt Peak	Spacewatch	·	2.8 km	MPC · JPL
577315	2013 CM_{116}	—	April 4, 2008	Mount Lemmon	Mount Lemmon Survey	·	2.9 km	MPC · JPL
577316	2013 CZ_{118}	—	December 3, 2005	Mauna Kea	A. Boattini	NYS	1.2 km	MPC · JPL
577317	2013 CS_{119}	—	September 25, 2011	Haleakala	Pan-STARRS 1	·	1.8 km	MPC · JPL
577318	2013 CH_{122}	—	October 24, 2005	Palomar	NEAT	·	3.5 km	MPC · JPL
577319	2013 CV_{125}	—	February 14, 2002	Kitt Peak	Spacewatch	·	2.9 km	MPC · JPL
577320	2013 CY_{125}	—	December 2, 2005	Mauna Kea	A. Boattini	·	1.1 km	MPC · JPL
577321	2013 CC_{127}	—	February 14, 2013	Catalina	CSS	·	2.1 km	MPC · JPL
577322	2013 CE_{127}	—	February 14, 2013	Haleakala	Pan-STARRS 1	·	3.6 km	MPC · JPL
577323	2013 CQ_{132}	—	January 7, 2009	Kitt Peak	Spacewatch	·	1.1 km	MPC · JPL
577324	2013 CD_{133}	—	September 9, 2004	Kitt Peak	Spacewatch	URS	2.8 km	MPC · JPL
577325	2013 CQ_{133}	—	September 19, 2009	Kitt Peak	Spacewatch	L4	6.9 km	MPC · JPL
577326	2013 CH_{134}	—	July 22, 2004	Mauna Kea	Veillet, C.	·	4.1 km	MPC · JPL
577327	2013 CP_{136}	—	January 15, 2013	ESA OGS	ESA OGS	·	3.6 km	MPC · JPL
577328	2013 CV_{137}	—	February 13, 2013	Haleakala	Pan-STARRS 1	ARM	3.0 km	MPC · JPL
577329	2013 CB_{139}	—	February 13, 2008	Kitt Peak	Spacewatch	EOS	1.7 km	MPC · JPL
577330	2013 CK_{140}	—	April 9, 2008	Kitt Peak	Spacewatch	·	2.5 km	MPC · JPL
577331	2013 CX_{140}	—	October 25, 2011	Haleakala	Pan-STARRS 1	·	3.1 km	MPC · JPL
577332	2013 CJ_{142}	—	February 8, 2008	Kitt Peak	Spacewatch	·	1.5 km	MPC · JPL
577333	2013 CB_{145}	—	December 26, 2006	Kitt Peak	Spacewatch	·	2.8 km	MPC · JPL
577334	2013 CV_{145}	—	February 5, 2013	Kitt Peak	Spacewatch	·	2.5 km	MPC · JPL
577335	2013 CN_{147}	—	November 24, 2011	Mount Lemmon	Mount Lemmon Survey	·	2.8 km	MPC · JPL
577336	2013 CX_{148}	—	November 30, 2008	Kitt Peak	Spacewatch	·	710 m	MPC · JPL
577337	2013 CQ_{149}	—	October 6, 2008	Mount Lemmon	Mount Lemmon Survey	·	750 m	MPC · JPL
577338	2013 CY_{149}	—	October 15, 2001	Palomar	NEAT	·	820 m	MPC · JPL
577339	2013 CA_{155}	—	February 14, 2013	Haleakala	Pan-STARRS 1	·	600 m	MPC · JPL
577340	2013 CH_{156}	—	February 14, 2013	Haleakala	Pan-STARRS 1	MAS	490 m	MPC · JPL
577341	2013 CW_{156}	—	March 12, 2002	Palomar	NEAT	·	2.9 km	MPC · JPL
577342	2013 CV_{157}	—	April 1, 2003	Apache Point	SDSS Collaboration	·	1.5 km	MPC · JPL
577343	2013 CN_{163}	—	April 4, 2008	Mount Lemmon	Mount Lemmon Survey	·	1.5 km	MPC · JPL
577344	2013 CY_{165}	—	February 14, 2013	Haleakala	Pan-STARRS 1	·	840 m	MPC · JPL
577345	2013 CA_{167}	—	September 18, 2011	Mount Lemmon	Mount Lemmon Survey	·	620 m	MPC · JPL
577346	2013 CG_{168}	—	February 14, 2013	Haleakala	Pan-STARRS 1	·	2.4 km	MPC · JPL
577347	2013 CH_{168}	—	February 14, 2013	Haleakala	Pan-STARRS 1	·	650 m	MPC · JPL
577348	2013 CN_{168}	—	October 12, 2005	Kitt Peak	Spacewatch	·	2.2 km	MPC · JPL
577349	2013 CV_{168}	—	February 14, 2013	Mount Lemmon	Mount Lemmon Survey	·	740 m	MPC · JPL
577350	2013 CM_{171}	—	February 15, 2013	Haleakala	Pan-STARRS 1	EOS	1.7 km	MPC · JPL
577351	2013 CL_{172}	—	March 2, 2006	Kitt Peak	Spacewatch	·	760 m	MPC · JPL
577352	2013 CN_{176}	—	March 21, 2002	Kitt Peak	Spacewatch	·	1.4 km	MPC · JPL
577353	2013 CA_{178}	—	October 25, 2011	Haleakala	Pan-STARRS 1	EOS	2.1 km	MPC · JPL
577354	2013 CZ_{178}	—	September 23, 2008	Kitt Peak	Spacewatch	·	610 m	MPC · JPL
577355	2013 CA_{180}	—	January 12, 2007	7300	W. K. Y. Yeung	·	3.5 km	MPC · JPL
577356	2013 CN_{187}	—	January 20, 2013	Kitt Peak	Spacewatch	·	2.3 km	MPC · JPL
577357	2013 CZ_{188}	—	September 5, 2010	La Sagra	OAM	·	3.4 km	MPC · JPL
577358	2013 CW_{189}	—	February 7, 2002	Kitt Peak	Spacewatch	·	3.4 km	MPC · JPL
577359	2013 CV_{193}	—	June 20, 2010	Mount Lemmon	Mount Lemmon Survey	·	3.2 km	MPC · JPL
577360	2013 CZ_{193}	—	October 29, 2008	Kitt Peak	Spacewatch	·	770 m	MPC · JPL
577361	2013 CM_{195}	—	August 14, 2010	Kitt Peak	Spacewatch	·	2.9 km	MPC · JPL
577362	2013 CT_{196}	—	July 15, 2004	Cerro Tololo	Deep Ecliptic Survey	L4	8.9 km	MPC · JPL
577363	2013 CS_{197}	—	December 24, 2006	Kitt Peak	Spacewatch	HYG	2.1 km	MPC · JPL
577364	2013 CA_{200}	—	February 5, 2013	Mount Lemmon	Mount Lemmon Survey	·	2.7 km	MPC · JPL
577365	2013 CW_{201}	—	March 2, 2009	Mount Lemmon	Mount Lemmon Survey	KON	1.5 km	MPC · JPL
577366	2013 CK_{202}	—	September 11, 2004	Kitt Peak	Spacewatch	·	690 m	MPC · JPL
577367	2013 CM_{202}	—	March 4, 2006	Mount Lemmon	Mount Lemmon Survey	NYS	780 m	MPC · JPL
577368	2013 CA_{203}	—	January 26, 2006	Mount Lemmon	Mount Lemmon Survey	V	450 m	MPC · JPL
577369	2013 CV_{203}	—	January 19, 2013	Kitt Peak	Spacewatch	·	2.7 km	MPC · JPL
577370	2013 CL_{206}	—	October 26, 2011	Haleakala	Pan-STARRS 1	·	2.6 km	MPC · JPL
577371	2013 CQ_{208}	—	February 14, 2013	Kitt Peak	Spacewatch	·	630 m	MPC · JPL
577372	2013 CK_{210}	—	October 23, 2011	Haleakala	Pan-STARRS 1	EOS	1.8 km	MPC · JPL
577373	2013 CS_{210}	—	November 11, 2006	Mount Lemmon	Mount Lemmon Survey	·	1.5 km	MPC · JPL
577374	2013 CV_{210}	—	December 27, 2006	Mount Lemmon	Mount Lemmon Survey	·	3.0 km	MPC · JPL
577375	2013 CM_{211}	—	October 24, 2008	Mount Lemmon	Mount Lemmon Survey	·	610 m	MPC · JPL
577376	2013 CQ_{212}	—	November 19, 2008	Kitt Peak	Spacewatch	·	790 m	MPC · JPL
577377	2013 CH_{213}	—	October 25, 2011	Haleakala	Pan-STARRS 1	EOS	1.8 km	MPC · JPL
577378	2013 CW_{213}	—	February 28, 2008	Kitt Peak	Spacewatch	·	2.5 km	MPC · JPL
577379	2013 CL_{215}	—	February 8, 2013	Haleakala	Pan-STARRS 1	·	2.4 km	MPC · JPL
577380	2013 CY_{215}	—	October 10, 2005	Catalina	CSS	·	3.7 km	MPC · JPL
577381	2013 CA_{216}	—	February 12, 2002	Kitt Peak	Spacewatch	·	2.9 km	MPC · JPL
577382	2013 CF_{216}	—	March 3, 1997	Kitt Peak	Spacewatch	EOS	1.6 km	MPC · JPL
577383	2013 CQ_{216}	—	October 14, 2009	Mount Lemmon	Mount Lemmon Survey	L4	7.4 km	MPC · JPL
577384	2013 CR_{219}	—	February 9, 2013	Haleakala	Pan-STARRS 1	·	700 m	MPC · JPL
577385	2013 CY_{221}	—	November 3, 2010	Kitt Peak	Spacewatch	L4	6.8 km	MPC · JPL
577386	2013 CC_{225}	—	February 14, 2013	Kitt Peak	Spacewatch	·	2.9 km	MPC · JPL
577387	2013 CG_{229}	—	February 14, 2013	Haleakala	Pan-STARRS 1	·	2.2 km	MPC · JPL
577388	2013 CS_{229}	—	March 1, 2008	Catalina	CSS	T_{j} (2.97)	2.7 km	MPC · JPL
577389	2013 CY_{229}	—	February 3, 2013	Haleakala	Pan-STARRS 1	V	500 m	MPC · JPL
577390	2013 CA_{230}	—	February 5, 2013	Kitt Peak	Spacewatch	·	570 m	MPC · JPL
577391	2013 CB_{231}	—	February 14, 2013	Haleakala	Pan-STARRS 1	·	800 m	MPC · JPL
577392	2013 CC_{232}	—	February 3, 2013	Haleakala	Pan-STARRS 1	·	530 m	MPC · JPL
577393	2013 CJ_{232}	—	February 14, 2013	Mount Lemmon	Mount Lemmon Survey	·	810 m	MPC · JPL
577394	2013 CY_{233}	—	September 19, 2008	Kitt Peak	Spacewatch	·	530 m	MPC · JPL
577395	2013 CR_{236}	—	February 13, 2013	Haleakala	Pan-STARRS 1	·	2.9 km	MPC · JPL
577396	2013 CT_{237}	—	February 8, 2013	Haleakala	Pan-STARRS 1	·	2.6 km	MPC · JPL
577397	2013 CC_{238}	—	July 4, 2014	Haleakala	Pan-STARRS 1	V	370 m	MPC · JPL
577398	2013 CZ_{238}	—	February 3, 2013	Haleakala	Pan-STARRS 1	·	2.7 km	MPC · JPL
577399	2013 CB_{239}	—	February 14, 2013	Kitt Peak	Spacewatch	·	830 m	MPC · JPL
577400	2013 CH_{239}	—	February 10, 2013	Haleakala	Pan-STARRS 1	PHO	930 m	MPC · JPL

== 577401–577500 ==
back to top

Designation			Discovery			Properties		Ref
Permanent	Provisional	Named after	Date	Site	Discoverer(s)	Category	Diam.	Ref
577401	2013 CX_{240}	—	February 15, 2013	Haleakala	Pan-STARRS 1	·	2.6 km	MPC · JPL
577402	2013 CR_{242}	—	February 8, 2013	Haleakala	Pan-STARRS 1	VER	2.4 km	MPC · JPL
577403	2013 CG_{243}	—	February 15, 2013	Haleakala	Pan-STARRS 1	·	2.7 km	MPC · JPL
577404	2013 CH_{244}	—	February 3, 2013	Haleakala	Pan-STARRS 1	·	2.9 km	MPC · JPL
577405	2013 CN_{244}	—	February 3, 2013	Haleakala	Pan-STARRS 1	·	1.4 km	MPC · JPL
577406	2013 CO_{244}	—	February 14, 2013	Haleakala	Pan-STARRS 1	·	2.5 km	MPC · JPL
577407	2013 CE_{245}	—	February 15, 2013	Haleakala	Pan-STARRS 1	·	1.8 km	MPC · JPL
577408	2013 CF_{249}	—	February 15, 2013	Haleakala	Pan-STARRS 1	·	1.4 km	MPC · JPL
577409	2013 DV_{1}	—	November 2, 2011	Mount Lemmon	Mount Lemmon Survey	·	2.8 km	MPC · JPL
577410	2013 DY_{1}	—	September 3, 2005	Palomar	NEAT	·	3.6 km	MPC · JPL
577411	2013 DA_{3}	—	March 25, 2003	Palomar	NEAT	EOS	2.4 km	MPC · JPL
577412	2013 DA_{10}	—	February 20, 2002	Kitt Peak	Spacewatch	VER	2.7 km	MPC · JPL
577413	2013 DL_{10}	—	January 20, 2013	Kitt Peak	Spacewatch	EOS	2.0 km	MPC · JPL
577414	2013 DU_{12}	—	February 17, 2013	Mount Lemmon	Mount Lemmon Survey	·	2.7 km	MPC · JPL
577415	2013 DW_{14}	—	October 25, 2011	Haleakala	Pan-STARRS 1	VER	3.0 km	MPC · JPL
577416	2013 DD_{15}	—	February 5, 2013	Kitt Peak	Spacewatch	·	2.4 km	MPC · JPL
577417	2013 DB_{17}	—	March 6, 2013	Haleakala	Pan-STARRS 1	·	3.1 km	MPC · JPL
577418	2013 DZ_{17}	—	February 16, 2013	Mount Lemmon	Mount Lemmon Survey	·	2.0 km	MPC · JPL
577419	2013 DJ_{20}	—	February 18, 2013	Kitt Peak	Spacewatch	VER	2.3 km	MPC · JPL
577420	2013 DZ_{20}	—	February 16, 2013	Mount Lemmon	Mount Lemmon Survey	·	2.6 km	MPC · JPL
577421	2013 DH_{21}	—	February 17, 2013	Mount Lemmon	Mount Lemmon Survey	·	2.6 km	MPC · JPL
577422	2013 EN_{1}	—	April 9, 2006	Kitt Peak	Spacewatch	·	750 m	MPC · JPL
577423	2013 EM_{7}	—	March 3, 2013	Mount Lemmon	Mount Lemmon Survey	·	1.1 km	MPC · JPL
577424	2013 EU_{7}	—	January 12, 2002	Palomar	NEAT	NYS	930 m	MPC · JPL
577425	2013 EY_{13}	—	October 19, 2011	Mount Lemmon	Mount Lemmon Survey	·	610 m	MPC · JPL
577426	2013 EB_{14}	—	February 17, 2013	Kitt Peak	Spacewatch	·	2.3 km	MPC · JPL
577427	2013 EH_{14}	—	January 2, 2009	Mount Lemmon	Mount Lemmon Survey	MAS	540 m	MPC · JPL
577428	2013 EG_{15}	—	February 9, 2002	Kitt Peak	Spacewatch	·	2.5 km	MPC · JPL
577429	2013 EL_{15}	—	January 19, 2013	Kitt Peak	Spacewatch	·	2.9 km	MPC · JPL
577430	2013 EP_{16}	—	March 3, 2013	Kitt Peak	Spacewatch	·	630 m	MPC · JPL
577431	2013 EQ_{20}	—	March 6, 2013	Haleakala	Pan-STARRS 1	H	380 m	MPC · JPL
577432	2013 EF_{23}	—	February 15, 2013	Haleakala	Pan-STARRS 1	·	750 m	MPC · JPL
577433	2013 EL_{27}	—	March 15, 2002	Palomar	NEAT	PHO	930 m	MPC · JPL
577434	2013 EU_{28}	—	May 2, 2006	Mount Lemmon	Mount Lemmon Survey	·	770 m	MPC · JPL
577435	2013 ES_{31}	—	March 7, 2013	Kitt Peak	Spacewatch	·	1.1 km	MPC · JPL
577436	2013 EV_{31}	—	March 7, 2013	Kitt Peak	Spacewatch	·	1.2 km	MPC · JPL
577437	2013 ER_{33}	—	February 8, 2007	Palomar	NEAT	·	3.8 km	MPC · JPL
577438	2013 ED_{36}	—	November 17, 2011	Mount Lemmon	Mount Lemmon Survey	·	930 m	MPC · JPL
577439	2013 EO_{41}	—	December 2, 2008	Siding Spring	SSS	PHO	720 m	MPC · JPL
577440	2013 EU_{44}	—	March 6, 2013	Haleakala	Pan-STARRS 1	·	900 m	MPC · JPL
577441	2013 EM_{46}	—	September 4, 2011	Haleakala	Pan-STARRS 1	·	600 m	MPC · JPL
577442	2013 EC_{47}	—	September 29, 2010	Mount Lemmon	Mount Lemmon Survey	·	2.1 km	MPC · JPL
577443	2013 EO_{47}	—	March 6, 2013	Haleakala	Pan-STARRS 1	·	1.7 km	MPC · JPL
577444	2013 EM_{48}	—	February 9, 2002	Kitt Peak	Spacewatch	·	670 m	MPC · JPL
577445	2013 EM_{52}	—	February 18, 2013	Kitt Peak	Spacewatch	·	2.8 km	MPC · JPL
577446	2013 EE_{56}	—	March 8, 2013	Haleakala	Pan-STARRS 1	NYS	850 m	MPC · JPL
577447	2013 ET_{58}	—	March 8, 2013	Haleakala	Pan-STARRS 1	·	3.0 km	MPC · JPL
577448	2013 EB_{59}	—	February 20, 2002	Kitt Peak	Spacewatch	·	880 m	MPC · JPL
577449	2013 EV_{61}	—	October 13, 2006	Kitt Peak	Spacewatch	·	1.6 km	MPC · JPL
577450	2013 EP_{62}	—	April 1, 2008	Mount Lemmon	Mount Lemmon Survey	·	2.1 km	MPC · JPL
577451	2013 ED_{67}	—	February 7, 2013	Kitt Peak	Spacewatch	·	2.5 km	MPC · JPL
577452	2013 ES_{72}	—	March 7, 2013	Mount Lemmon	Mount Lemmon Survey	·	2.7 km	MPC · JPL
577453	2013 EX_{72}	—	March 7, 2013	Mount Lemmon	Mount Lemmon Survey	·	2.5 km	MPC · JPL
577454	2013 EG_{75}	—	March 7, 2013	Mount Lemmon	Mount Lemmon Survey	·	570 m	MPC · JPL
577455	2013 ER_{80}	—	February 13, 2002	Kitt Peak	Spacewatch	EOS	1.8 km	MPC · JPL
577456	2013 ET_{82}	—	May 10, 2002	Kitt Peak	Spacewatch	·	1.1 km	MPC · JPL
577457	2013 EN_{83}	—	April 14, 2008	Mount Lemmon	Mount Lemmon Survey	·	1.9 km	MPC · JPL
577458	2013 EP_{83}	—	October 24, 2011	Haleakala	Pan-STARRS 1	V	530 m	MPC · JPL
577459	2013 EM_{84}	—	November 1, 2010	Mount Lemmon	Mount Lemmon Survey	·	2.9 km	MPC · JPL
577460	2013 ER_{87}	—	March 12, 2013	Elena Remote	Oreshko, A.	MAS	630 m	MPC · JPL
577461	2013 EY_{88}	—	March 13, 2013	Mount Lemmon	Mount Lemmon Survey	·	2.6 km	MPC · JPL
577462	2013 EE_{92}	—	March 25, 2006	Palomar	NEAT	·	1.1 km	MPC · JPL
577463	2013 EL_{93}	—	March 13, 2013	Catalina	CSS	EUP	3.0 km	MPC · JPL
577464	2013 EE_{95}	—	August 30, 2005	Palomar	NEAT	·	2.5 km	MPC · JPL
577465	2013 EG_{96}	—	March 8, 2013	Haleakala	Pan-STARRS 1	·	670 m	MPC · JPL
577466	2013 EP_{96}	—	September 11, 2010	Kitt Peak	Spacewatch	EOS	1.8 km	MPC · JPL
577467	2013 EW_{96}	—	March 8, 2013	Haleakala	Pan-STARRS 1	PHO	800 m	MPC · JPL
577468	2013 EV_{97}	—	August 31, 2005	Kitt Peak	Spacewatch	·	1.7 km	MPC · JPL
577469	2013 EF_{100}	—	March 8, 2013	Haleakala	Pan-STARRS 1	·	2.7 km	MPC · JPL
577470	2013 EL_{100}	—	October 31, 2010	Mount Lemmon	Mount Lemmon Survey	·	2.7 km	MPC · JPL
577471	2013 ET_{101}	—	February 2, 2006	Kitt Peak	Spacewatch	·	810 m	MPC · JPL
577472	2013 EM_{102}	—	March 11, 2013	Kitt Peak	Spacewatch	·	1.1 km	MPC · JPL
577473	2013 ET_{103}	—	April 5, 2008	Kitt Peak	Spacewatch	·	2.5 km	MPC · JPL
577474	2013 EU_{103}	—	February 7, 2013	Catalina	CSS	·	3.4 km	MPC · JPL
577475	2013 ER_{104}	—	December 1, 2008	Kitt Peak	Spacewatch	·	640 m	MPC · JPL
577476	2013 EF_{105}	—	March 13, 2013	Kitt Peak	Spacewatch	·	2.7 km	MPC · JPL
577477	2013 EK_{105}	—	January 17, 2013	Mount Lemmon	Mount Lemmon Survey	·	650 m	MPC · JPL
577478	2013 EM_{106}	—	March 13, 2013	Kitt Peak	Spacewatch	·	1.2 km	MPC · JPL
577479	2013 EW_{106}	—	September 23, 2011	Mount Lemmon	Mount Lemmon Survey	·	850 m	MPC · JPL
577480	2013 EH_{112}	—	September 26, 2003	Palomar	NEAT	·	1.7 km	MPC · JPL
577481	2013 EL_{112}	—	December 21, 2006	Kitt Peak	Spacewatch	EOS	1.8 km	MPC · JPL
577482	2013 EB_{118}	—	March 14, 2013	Mount Lemmon	Mount Lemmon Survey	·	2.6 km	MPC · JPL
577483	2013 ED_{118}	—	September 3, 2010	Mount Lemmon	Mount Lemmon Survey	ELF	2.9 km	MPC · JPL
577484	2013 EF_{118}	—	May 9, 2002	Palomar	NEAT	NYS	1.2 km	MPC · JPL
577485	2013 EV_{118}	—	March 5, 2013	Nogales	M. Schwartz, P. R. Holvorcem	·	1.2 km	MPC · JPL
577486	2013 EX_{118}	—	April 24, 2008	Mount Lemmon	Mount Lemmon Survey	VER	2.7 km	MPC · JPL
577487	2013 ED_{121}	—	February 22, 2002	Palomar	NEAT	·	1.2 km	MPC · JPL
577488	2013 EW_{121}	—	January 20, 2009	Mount Lemmon	Mount Lemmon Survey	·	1.2 km	MPC · JPL
577489	2013 EC_{124}	—	March 13, 2013	Mount Lemmon	Mount Lemmon Survey	·	890 m	MPC · JPL
577490	2013 EL_{141}	—	January 10, 2013	Haleakala	Pan-STARRS 1	·	2.3 km	MPC · JPL
577491	2013 ES_{141}	—	March 13, 2013	Kitt Peak	Research and Education Collaborative Occultation Network	·	2.3 km	MPC · JPL
577492	2013 EC_{156}	—	April 10, 2013	Haleakala	Pan-STARRS 1	·	890 m	MPC · JPL
577493	2013 EW_{157}	—	March 15, 2013	Kitt Peak	Spacewatch	·	700 m	MPC · JPL
577494	2013 EH_{158}	—	March 4, 2013	Haleakala	Pan-STARRS 1	·	2.7 km	MPC · JPL
577495	2013 EM_{159}	—	June 28, 2014	Haleakala	Pan-STARRS 1	·	940 m	MPC · JPL
577496	2013 EV_{159}	—	September 19, 2014	Haleakala	Pan-STARRS 1	·	880 m	MPC · JPL
577497	2013 ED_{160}	—	March 4, 2013	Haleakala	Pan-STARRS 1	·	640 m	MPC · JPL
577498	2013 EE_{160}	—	March 8, 2013	Haleakala	Pan-STARRS 1	·	770 m	MPC · JPL
577499	2013 EM_{164}	—	January 18, 2009	Kitt Peak	Spacewatch	·	920 m	MPC · JPL
577500	2013 EJ_{165}	—	December 23, 2016	Haleakala	Pan-STARRS 1	·	1.6 km	MPC · JPL

== 577501–577600 ==
back to top

Designation			Discovery			Properties		Ref
Permanent	Provisional	Named after	Date	Site	Discoverer(s)	Category	Diam.	Ref
577501	2013 EE_{166}	—	August 10, 2016	Haleakala	Pan-STARRS 1	·	3.7 km	MPC · JPL
577502	2013 EJ_{166}	—	February 1, 2006	Kitt Peak	Spacewatch	·	600 m	MPC · JPL
577503	2013 ES_{166}	—	June 27, 2015	Haleakala	Pan-STARRS 1	·	2.6 km	MPC · JPL
577504	2013 EH_{168}	—	March 6, 2013	Haleakala	Pan-STARRS 1	(2076)	670 m	MPC · JPL
577505	2013 EQ_{168}	—	March 5, 2013	Haleakala	Pan-STARRS 1	·	770 m	MPC · JPL
577506	2013 ET_{169}	—	March 6, 2013	Haleakala	Pan-STARRS 1	·	670 m	MPC · JPL
577507	2013 EW_{171}	—	March 13, 2013	Mount Lemmon	Mount Lemmon Survey	·	2.1 km	MPC · JPL
577508	2013 FO_{3}	—	March 14, 2013	Palomar	Palomar Transient Factory	·	3.8 km	MPC · JPL
577509	2013 FP_{3}	—	January 10, 2007	Mount Lemmon	Mount Lemmon Survey	EUP	2.6 km	MPC · JPL
577510	2013 FV_{5}	—	June 20, 2006	Palomar	NEAT	·	1.2 km	MPC · JPL
577511	2013 FY_{5}	—	October 28, 2005	Mount Lemmon	Mount Lemmon Survey	·	2.5 km	MPC · JPL
577512	2013 FM_{12}	—	March 19, 2013	Palomar	Palomar Transient Factory	·	1.3 km	MPC · JPL
577513	2013 FH_{14}	—	January 27, 2007	Mount Lemmon	Mount Lemmon Survey	·	3.5 km	MPC · JPL
577514	2013 FW_{16}	—	March 24, 2013	Mount Lemmon	Mount Lemmon Survey	·	1.1 km	MPC · JPL
577515	2013 FU_{17}	—	March 10, 2007	Kitt Peak	Spacewatch	·	3.3 km	MPC · JPL
577516	2013 FP_{22}	—	September 26, 2003	Apache Point	SDSS	·	1.2 km	MPC · JPL
577517	2013 FU_{22}	—	May 10, 2002	Palomar	NEAT	·	1.9 km	MPC · JPL
577518	2013 FH_{23}	—	March 13, 2013	Kitt Peak	Spacewatch	·	1.1 km	MPC · JPL
577519	2013 FZ_{25}	—	February 21, 2013	Haleakala	Pan-STARRS 1	·	660 m	MPC · JPL
577520	2013 FK_{27}	—	March 19, 2013	Haleakala	Pan-STARRS 1	·	2.1 km	MPC · JPL
577521	2013 FL_{27}	—	March 3, 2006	Kitt Peak	Spacewatch	·	710 m	MPC · JPL
577522	2013 FL_{29}	—	March 16, 2013	Mount Lemmon	Mount Lemmon Survey	·	2.5 km	MPC · JPL
577523	2013 FC_{30}	—	March 19, 2013	Haleakala	Pan-STARRS 1	V	450 m	MPC · JPL
577524	2013 FO_{30}	—	May 9, 2014	Haleakala	Pan-STARRS 1	·	2.7 km	MPC · JPL
577525	2013 FN_{33}	—	March 19, 2013	Haleakala	Pan-STARRS 1	·	540 m	MPC · JPL
577526	2013 FK_{37}	—	March 19, 2013	Haleakala	Pan-STARRS 1	·	810 m	MPC · JPL
577527	2013 GT_{1}	—	March 12, 2002	Palomar	NEAT	·	1.2 km	MPC · JPL
577528	2013 GX_{4}	—	September 26, 2011	Haleakala	Pan-STARRS 1	(1338) (FLO)	470 m	MPC · JPL
577529	2013 GK_{7}	—	April 3, 2013	Palomar	Palomar Transient Factory	·	2.3 km	MPC · JPL
577530	2013 GQ_{9}	—	June 1, 2006	Wrightwood	J. W. Young	NYS	1.2 km	MPC · JPL
577531	2013 GV_{9}	—	October 13, 2010	Mount Lemmon	Mount Lemmon Survey	·	3.0 km	MPC · JPL
577532	2013 GL_{10}	—	November 21, 2001	Apache Point	SDSS	·	870 m	MPC · JPL
577533	2013 GT_{10}	—	April 1, 2013	Mount Lemmon	Mount Lemmon Survey	EOS	1.7 km	MPC · JPL
577534	2013 GB_{16}	—	March 28, 2008	Mount Lemmon	Mount Lemmon Survey	·	1.4 km	MPC · JPL
577535	2013 GR_{18}	—	October 27, 2005	Uccle	E. W. Elst, H. Debehogne	·	3.0 km	MPC · JPL
577536	2013 GK_{22}	—	February 1, 2009	Kitt Peak	Spacewatch	MAS	640 m	MPC · JPL
577537	2013 GA_{30}	—	April 19, 2006	Mount Lemmon	Mount Lemmon Survey	(2076)	950 m	MPC · JPL
577538	2013 GH_{30}	—	March 18, 2013	Kitt Peak	Spacewatch	·	3.2 km	MPC · JPL
577539	2013 GO_{31}	—	March 16, 2013	Mount Lemmon	Mount Lemmon Survey	·	2.2 km	MPC · JPL
577540	2013 GR_{37}	—	March 16, 2013	Kitt Peak	Spacewatch	·	940 m	MPC · JPL
577541	2013 GN_{39}	—	May 6, 2006	Mount Lemmon	Mount Lemmon Survey	·	1.1 km	MPC · JPL
577542	2013 GL_{40}	—	November 15, 2011	Mount Lemmon	Mount Lemmon Survey	V	490 m	MPC · JPL
577543	2013 GL_{41}	—	August 29, 2009	Kitt Peak	Spacewatch	·	2.7 km	MPC · JPL
577544	2013 GJ_{43}	—	October 24, 2011	Mount Lemmon	Mount Lemmon Survey	·	610 m	MPC · JPL
577545	2013 GS_{44}	—	March 13, 2013	Kitt Peak	Spacewatch	·	2.7 km	MPC · JPL
577546	2013 GF_{47}	—	November 24, 2011	Haleakala	Pan-STARRS 1	·	3.3 km	MPC · JPL
577547	2013 GN_{49}	—	May 4, 2002	Kitt Peak	Spacewatch	MAS	660 m	MPC · JPL
577548	2013 GF_{55}	—	March 17, 2013	Mount Lemmon	Mount Lemmon Survey	·	620 m	MPC · JPL
577549	2013 GS_{55}	—	February 23, 2007	Kitt Peak	Spacewatch	·	2.5 km	MPC · JPL
577550	2013 GZ_{61}	—	June 30, 2008	Kitt Peak	Spacewatch	(11097)	1.7 km	MPC · JPL
577551	2013 GB_{71}	—	May 4, 2006	Mount Lemmon	Mount Lemmon Survey	·	790 m	MPC · JPL
577552	2013 GP_{72}	—	February 3, 2009	Mount Lemmon	Mount Lemmon Survey	·	1.0 km	MPC · JPL
577553	2013 GH_{74}	—	March 13, 2013	Palomar	Palomar Transient Factory	·	1.4 km	MPC · JPL
577554	2013 GY_{75}	—	September 30, 2003	Kitt Peak	Spacewatch	MAS	750 m	MPC · JPL
577555	2013 GR_{76}	—	November 8, 2010	Mount Lemmon	Mount Lemmon Survey	·	2.7 km	MPC · JPL
577556	2013 GF_{83}	—	October 22, 2003	Kitt Peak	Spacewatch	·	1.2 km	MPC · JPL
577557	2013 GS_{85}	—	December 11, 2004	Kleť	Kleť	·	1.1 km	MPC · JPL
577558	2013 GY_{86}	—	August 23, 2003	Palomar	NEAT	·	3.4 km	MPC · JPL
577559	2013 GE_{88}	—	March 11, 2013	Mount Lemmon	Mount Lemmon Survey	·	1.2 km	MPC · JPL
577560	2013 GK_{89}	—	August 20, 2006	Palomar	NEAT	·	1.7 km	MPC · JPL
577561	2013 GD_{93}	—	September 17, 2010	Mount Lemmon	Mount Lemmon Survey	VER	2.4 km	MPC · JPL
577562	2013 GB_{95}	—	March 12, 2013	Mount Lemmon	Mount Lemmon Survey	·	920 m	MPC · JPL
577563	2013 GY_{97}	—	April 9, 2013	Haleakala	Pan-STARRS 1	·	940 m	MPC · JPL
577564	2013 GN_{103}	—	March 1, 2009	Mount Lemmon	Mount Lemmon Survey	·	1.2 km	MPC · JPL
577565	2013 GB_{104}	—	September 4, 2000	Kitt Peak	Spacewatch	·	1.0 km	MPC · JPL
577566	2013 GX_{112}	—	January 8, 1994	Kitt Peak	Spacewatch	NYS	970 m	MPC · JPL
577567	2013 GZ_{113}	—	April 2, 2002	Kitt Peak	Spacewatch	·	1.4 km	MPC · JPL
577568	2013 GG_{116}	—	February 2, 2009	Mount Lemmon	Mount Lemmon Survey	·	1.1 km	MPC · JPL
577569	2013 GR_{121}	—	June 20, 2002	La Palma	S. Collander-Brown, A. Fitzsimmons	·	1.2 km	MPC · JPL
577570	2013 GY_{121}	—	April 4, 2002	Palomar	NEAT	·	1.1 km	MPC · JPL
577571	2013 GR_{127}	—	March 1, 2009	Kitt Peak	Spacewatch	MAS	660 m	MPC · JPL
577572	2013 GX_{128}	—	February 1, 2009	Kitt Peak	Spacewatch	·	1.2 km	MPC · JPL
577573	2013 GE_{129}	—	October 31, 2010	Mount Lemmon	Mount Lemmon Survey	·	3.2 km	MPC · JPL
577574	2013 GR_{132}	—	February 7, 2002	Palomar	NEAT	·	2.3 km	MPC · JPL
577575	2013 GX_{133}	—	September 9, 2007	Kitt Peak	Spacewatch	·	1.0 km	MPC · JPL
577576	2013 GW_{134}	—	May 25, 2006	Kitt Peak	Spacewatch	·	1.3 km	MPC · JPL
577577	2013 GA_{136}	—	September 29, 2003	Kitt Peak	Spacewatch	V	670 m	MPC · JPL
577578	2013 GW_{136}	—	April 9, 2013	Mauna Kea	OSSOS	twotino	114 km	MPC · JPL
577579	2013 GY_{138}	—	February 19, 2009	Kitt Peak	Spacewatch	NYS	1.0 km	MPC · JPL
577580	2013 GG_{139}	—	April 11, 2013	Mount Lemmon	Mount Lemmon Survey	·	1.1 km	MPC · JPL
577581	2013 GH_{139}	—	March 3, 2009	Kitt Peak	Spacewatch	·	1.0 km	MPC · JPL
577582	2013 GS_{139}	—	March 1, 2009	Kitt Peak	Spacewatch	·	970 m	MPC · JPL
577583	2013 GX_{139}	—	April 15, 2013	Haleakala	Pan-STARRS 1	·	1.0 km	MPC · JPL
577584	2013 GP_{141}	—	September 30, 2006	Mount Lemmon	Mount Lemmon Survey	·	1.5 km	MPC · JPL
577585	2013 GV_{141}	—	April 13, 2013	Haleakala	Pan-STARRS 1	·	580 m	MPC · JPL
577586	2013 GW_{147}	—	April 12, 2013	Haleakala	Pan-STARRS 1	·	2.3 km	MPC · JPL
577587	2013 GH_{152}	—	April 15, 2013	Haleakala	Pan-STARRS 1	·	1.0 km	MPC · JPL
577588	2013 GO_{152}	—	April 10, 2013	Haleakala	Pan-STARRS 1	·	2.3 km	MPC · JPL
577589	2013 GU_{155}	—	April 9, 2013	Haleakala	Pan-STARRS 1	·	2.2 km	MPC · JPL
577590	2013 HG_{1}	—	April 4, 2013	Haleakala	Pan-STARRS 1	·	1.2 km	MPC · JPL
577591	2013 HP_{6}	—	November 10, 2010	Kitt Peak	Spacewatch	·	3.8 km	MPC · JPL
577592	2013 HG_{7}	—	April 17, 2013	Haleakala	Pan-STARRS 1	H	360 m	MPC · JPL
577593	2013 HP_{15}	—	April 13, 2002	Palomar	NEAT	·	1.5 km	MPC · JPL
577594	2013 HG_{16}	—	November 20, 2003	Kitt Peak	Spacewatch	·	1.3 km	MPC · JPL
577595	2013 HC_{25}	—	April 12, 2013	Haleakala	Pan-STARRS 1	·	1.7 km	MPC · JPL
577596	2013 HZ_{27}	—	February 3, 2009	Kitt Peak	Spacewatch	·	910 m	MPC · JPL
577597	2013 HM_{29}	—	October 29, 2010	Kitt Peak	Spacewatch	·	3.0 km	MPC · JPL
577598	2013 HU_{29}	—	April 16, 2013	Cerro Tololo-DECam	DECam	V	500 m	MPC · JPL
577599	2013 HO_{32}	—	January 3, 2009	Mount Lemmon	Mount Lemmon Survey	·	760 m	MPC · JPL
577600	2013 HK_{40}	—	May 14, 2008	Mount Lemmon	Mount Lemmon Survey	·	1.9 km	MPC · JPL

== 577601–577700 ==
back to top

Designation			Discovery			Properties		Ref
Permanent	Provisional	Named after	Date	Site	Discoverer(s)	Category	Diam.	Ref
577601	2013 HR_{44}	—	October 17, 2003	Apache Point	SDSS Collaboration	·	2.3 km	MPC · JPL
577602	2013 HJ_{45}	—	January 20, 2009	Kitt Peak	Spacewatch	·	950 m	MPC · JPL
577603	2013 HD_{52}	—	February 20, 2009	Mount Lemmon	Mount Lemmon Survey	·	740 m	MPC · JPL
577604	2013 HD_{55}	—	December 19, 2001	Palomar	NEAT	·	830 m	MPC · JPL
577605	2013 HP_{56}	—	April 16, 2013	Cerro Tololo-DECam	DECam	·	3.2 km	MPC · JPL
577606	2013 HB_{59}	—	October 12, 2004	Moletai	K. Černis, Zdanavicius, J.	·	770 m	MPC · JPL
577607	2013 HW_{62}	—	November 10, 2004	Kitt Peak	Spacewatch	·	900 m	MPC · JPL
577608	2013 HJ_{63}	—	September 18, 2003	Palomar	NEAT	·	1.2 km	MPC · JPL
577609	2013 HD_{70}	—	April 9, 2013	Haleakala	Pan-STARRS 1	·	2.4 km	MPC · JPL
577610	2013 HB_{78}	—	September 9, 2007	Kitt Peak	Spacewatch	V	570 m	MPC · JPL
577611	2013 HN_{83}	—	November 30, 2003	Kitt Peak	Spacewatch	·	970 m	MPC · JPL
577612	2013 HG_{85}	—	May 1, 2013	Mount Lemmon	Mount Lemmon Survey	·	1.8 km	MPC · JPL
577613	2013 HH_{87}	—	April 30, 2013	Mount Lemmon	Mount Lemmon Survey	·	740 m	MPC · JPL
577614	2013 HU_{98}	—	April 16, 2013	Cerro Tololo	DECam	VER	2.1 km	MPC · JPL
577615	2013 HF_{99}	—	April 9, 2013	Haleakala	Pan-STARRS 1	(43176)	2.2 km	MPC · JPL
577616	2013 HV_{100}	—	April 9, 2013	Haleakala	Pan-STARRS 1	·	760 m	MPC · JPL
577617	2013 HF_{101}	—	September 17, 2009	Catalina	CSS	T_{j} (2.98)	3.2 km	MPC · JPL
577618	2013 HY_{101}	—	April 9, 2013	Haleakala	Pan-STARRS 1	·	2.5 km	MPC · JPL
577619	2013 HO_{105}	—	April 16, 2013	Cerro Tololo-DECam	DECam	V	490 m	MPC · JPL
577620	2013 HZ_{116}	—	April 10, 2013	Haleakala	Pan-STARRS 1	·	740 m	MPC · JPL
577621	2013 HX_{118}	—	April 16, 2013	Cerro Tololo-DECam	DECam	NYS	920 m	MPC · JPL
577622	2013 HU_{124}	—	September 29, 2011	Piszkéstető	K. Sárneczky	·	750 m	MPC · JPL
577623	2013 HH_{142}	—	October 22, 2003	Kitt Peak	Spacewatch	·	800 m	MPC · JPL
577624	2013 HC_{145}	—	September 18, 2010	Mount Lemmon	Mount Lemmon Survey	·	2.8 km	MPC · JPL
577625	2013 HE_{145}	—	April 16, 2013	Cerro Tololo-DECam	DECam	·	2.2 km	MPC · JPL
577626	2013 HX_{150}	—	April 9, 2013	Haleakala	Pan-STARRS 1	·	2.2 km	MPC · JPL
577627	2013 HZ_{156}	—	April 17, 2013	Haleakala	Pan-STARRS 1	other TNO	133 km	MPC · JPL
577628	2013 HH_{158}	—	March 16, 2007	Kitt Peak	Spacewatch	·	2.4 km	MPC · JPL
577629	2013 HP_{158}	—	April 19, 2013	Haleakala	Pan-STARRS 1	·	2.8 km	MPC · JPL
577630	2013 HE_{160}	—	October 1, 2015	Mount Lemmon	Mount Lemmon Survey	·	2.7 km	MPC · JPL
577631	2013 HV_{160}	—	April 19, 2013	Haleakala	Pan-STARRS 1	·	2.6 km	MPC · JPL
577632	2013 HO_{163}	—	January 1, 2012	Mount Lemmon	Mount Lemmon Survey	·	2.5 km	MPC · JPL
577633	2013 HS_{163}	—	April 16, 2013	Haleakala	Pan-STARRS 1	·	750 m	MPC · JPL
577634	2013 JJ_{9}	—	February 20, 2009	Mount Lemmon	Mount Lemmon Survey	·	910 m	MPC · JPL
577635	2013 JR_{10}	—	September 18, 2010	Mount Lemmon	Mount Lemmon Survey	·	1.1 km	MPC · JPL
577636	2013 JC_{11}	—	October 15, 2003	Palomar	NEAT	·	1.2 km	MPC · JPL
577637	2013 JH_{11}	—	February 20, 2009	Kitt Peak	Spacewatch	NYS	1.1 km	MPC · JPL
577638	2013 JS_{12}	—	September 19, 2009	Mount Lemmon	Mount Lemmon Survey	·	3.3 km	MPC · JPL
577639	2013 JB_{17}	—	May 9, 2013	Mount Lemmon	Mount Lemmon Survey	H	420 m	MPC · JPL
577640	2013 JS_{21}	—	April 5, 2013	Palomar	Palomar Transient Factory	H	430 m	MPC · JPL
577641	2013 JE_{22}	—	October 24, 2011	Haleakala	Pan-STARRS 1	·	1.1 km	MPC · JPL
577642	2013 JB_{24}	—	May 9, 2013	Calar Alto	F. Hormuth	·	3.1 km	MPC · JPL
577643	2013 JN_{27}	—	March 11, 2007	Kitt Peak	Spacewatch	·	2.5 km	MPC · JPL
577644	2013 JD_{31}	—	April 18, 2013	Mount Lemmon	Mount Lemmon Survey	T_{j} (2.92)	3.2 km	MPC · JPL
577645	2013 JA_{42}	—	February 20, 2009	Kitt Peak	Spacewatch	·	1.1 km	MPC · JPL
577646	2013 JF_{42}	—	October 23, 2011	Haleakala	Pan-STARRS 1	·	2.2 km	MPC · JPL
577647	2013 JL_{47}	—	September 10, 2004	Kitt Peak	Spacewatch	·	3.5 km	MPC · JPL
577648	2013 JB_{49}	—	September 12, 2002	Palomar	NEAT	·	4.2 km	MPC · JPL
577649	2013 JB_{52}	—	April 10, 2013	Haleakala	Pan-STARRS 1	·	2.2 km	MPC · JPL
577650	2013 JC_{52}	—	February 28, 2009	Kitt Peak	Spacewatch	MAS	710 m	MPC · JPL
577651	2013 JQ_{57}	—	September 11, 2010	Kitt Peak	Spacewatch	·	960 m	MPC · JPL
577652	2013 JE_{61}	—	February 19, 2009	Kitt Peak	Spacewatch	·	960 m	MPC · JPL
577653	2013 JG_{63}	—	April 18, 2013	Mount Lemmon	Mount Lemmon Survey	PHO	930 m	MPC · JPL
577654	2013 JN_{63}	—	October 29, 2011	Kitt Peak	Spacewatch	PHO	1.3 km	MPC · JPL
577655	2013 JD_{67}	—	May 15, 2013	Haleakala	Pan-STARRS 1	V	550 m	MPC · JPL
577656	2013 JS_{67}	—	May 8, 2013	Haleakala	Pan-STARRS 1	·	1.0 km	MPC · JPL
577657	2013 JV_{67}	—	May 2, 2013	Kitt Peak	Spacewatch	(883)	640 m	MPC · JPL
577658	2013 KP_{4}	—	October 3, 2003	Kitt Peak	Spacewatch	H	480 m	MPC · JPL
577659	2013 KB_{8}	—	December 28, 2011	Mount Lemmon	Mount Lemmon Survey	·	980 m	MPC · JPL
577660	2013 KP_{8}	—	September 18, 2010	Mount Lemmon	Mount Lemmon Survey	(1118)	3.2 km	MPC · JPL
577661	2013 KS_{8}	—	April 4, 2002	Kitt Peak	Spacewatch	MAS	750 m	MPC · JPL
577662	2013 KT_{14}	—	October 14, 2010	Mount Lemmon	Mount Lemmon Survey	·	3.3 km	MPC · JPL
577663	2013 KG_{19}	—	May 16, 2013	Haleakala	Pan-STARRS 1	·	3.1 km	MPC · JPL
577664	2013 LG_{1}	—	March 21, 2009	Mount Lemmon	Mount Lemmon Survey	·	860 m	MPC · JPL
577665	2013 LQ_{8}	—	September 25, 2008	Mount Lemmon	Mount Lemmon Survey	·	2.5 km	MPC · JPL
577666	2013 LG_{15}	—	October 20, 2003	Palomar	NEAT	·	790 m	MPC · JPL
577667	2013 LB_{17}	—	August 29, 2006	Catalina	CSS	V	840 m	MPC · JPL
577668	2013 LF_{18}	—	May 17, 2013	Mount Lemmon	Mount Lemmon Survey	·	510 m	MPC · JPL
577669	2013 LM_{20}	—	February 1, 2005	Kitt Peak	Spacewatch	NYS	1.2 km	MPC · JPL
577670	2013 LR_{22}	—	June 4, 2013	Mount Lemmon	Mount Lemmon Survey	·	2.5 km	MPC · JPL
577671	2013 LO_{25}	—	October 1, 2010	Mount Lemmon	Mount Lemmon Survey	MAS	600 m	MPC · JPL
577672	2013 LD_{38}	—	June 1, 2013	Mount Lemmon	Mount Lemmon Survey	·	3.1 km	MPC · JPL
577673	2013 LH_{40}	—	June 1, 2013	Haleakala	Pan-STARRS 1	·	750 m	MPC · JPL
577674	2013 MS_{2}	—	January 14, 1997	Caussols	ODAS	·	1.6 km	MPC · JPL
577675	2013 MB_{5}	—	January 28, 2004	Kitt Peak	Spacewatch	H	510 m	MPC · JPL
577676	2013 MA_{6}	—	June 18, 2013	Haleakala	Pan-STARRS 1	H	530 m	MPC · JPL
577677	2013 MD_{12}	—	January 17, 2007	Palomar	NEAT	H	410 m	MPC · JPL
577678	2013 MK_{12}	—	June 17, 2013	Haleakala	Pan-STARRS 1	·	1.1 km	MPC · JPL
577679	2013 MZ_{13}	—	January 3, 2011	Mount Lemmon	Mount Lemmon Survey	·	1.3 km	MPC · JPL
577680	2013 MB_{15}	—	June 30, 2013	Haleakala	Pan-STARRS 1	·	1.4 km	MPC · JPL
577681	2013 MB_{16}	—	November 29, 2014	Mount Lemmon	Mount Lemmon Survey	·	1.2 km	MPC · JPL
577682	2013 MJ_{16}	—	June 20, 2013	Haleakala	Pan-STARRS 1	·	1.2 km	MPC · JPL
577683	2013 MD_{17}	—	June 18, 2013	Haleakala	Pan-STARRS 1	·	1.3 km	MPC · JPL
577684	2013 ME_{18}	—	June 18, 2013	Haleakala	Pan-STARRS 1	·	1.1 km	MPC · JPL
577685	2013 MN_{18}	—	June 18, 2013	Haleakala	Pan-STARRS 1	NYS	820 m	MPC · JPL
577686	2013 NX_{2}	—	July 1, 2013	Haleakala	Pan-STARRS 1	·	2.8 km	MPC · JPL
577687	2013 NQ_{6}	—	July 3, 2013	Haleakala	Pan-STARRS 1	H	410 m	MPC · JPL
577688	2013 NY_{9}	—	July 6, 2013	Haleakala	Pan-STARRS 1	·	1.1 km	MPC · JPL
577689	2013 NZ_{9}	—	June 2, 2013	Elena Remote	Oreshko, A.	·	1.2 km	MPC · JPL
577690	2013 NC_{16}	—	July 29, 2005	Palomar	NEAT	·	1.7 km	MPC · JPL
577691	2013 NT_{18}	—	May 29, 2009	Kitt Peak	Spacewatch	MAS	580 m	MPC · JPL
577692	2013 NS_{20}	—	June 18, 2013	Haleakala	Pan-STARRS 1	H	340 m	MPC · JPL
577693	2013 NN_{22}	—	July 13, 2013	Haleakala	Pan-STARRS 1	·	1.6 km	MPC · JPL
577694	2013 NO_{23}	—	June 20, 2013	Haleakala	Pan-STARRS 1	·	1.1 km	MPC · JPL
577695	2013 NU_{23}	—	June 19, 2013	Mount Lemmon	Mount Lemmon Survey	·	1.4 km	MPC · JPL
577696	2013 NG_{25}	—	July 15, 2013	Haleakala	Pan-STARRS 1	·	840 m	MPC · JPL
577697	2013 NN_{25}	—	January 4, 2011	Mount Lemmon	Mount Lemmon Survey	·	1.0 km	MPC · JPL
577698	2013 NQ_{25}	—	March 29, 2008	Vail-Jarnac	Jarnac	·	1.3 km	MPC · JPL
577699	2013 NL_{26}	—	May 5, 2008	Mount Lemmon	Mount Lemmon Survey	·	1.1 km	MPC · JPL
577700	2013 NG_{28}	—	July 2, 2005	Kitt Peak	Spacewatch	·	1.5 km	MPC · JPL

== 577701–577800 ==
back to top

Designation			Discovery			Properties		Ref
Permanent	Provisional	Named after	Date	Site	Discoverer(s)	Category	Diam.	Ref
577701	2013 NC_{34}	—	July 13, 2013	Haleakala	Pan-STARRS 1	MAR	1.1 km	MPC · JPL
577702	2013 NB_{35}	—	July 15, 2013	Haleakala	Pan-STARRS 1	·	1.0 km	MPC · JPL
577703	2013 NK_{35}	—	July 12, 2013	Haleakala	Pan-STARRS 1	·	1.2 km	MPC · JPL
577704	2013 NM_{41}	—	July 15, 2013	Haleakala	Pan-STARRS 1	PHO	630 m	MPC · JPL
577705	2013 NQ_{41}	—	July 15, 2013	Haleakala	Pan-STARRS 1	MAR	860 m	MPC · JPL
577706	2013 NT_{53}	—	July 12, 2013	Haleakala	Pan-STARRS 1	·	990 m	MPC · JPL
577707	2013 NQ_{58}	—	September 29, 2009	Mount Lemmon	Mount Lemmon Survey	·	1.4 km	MPC · JPL
577708	2013 ON_{1}	—	July 15, 2013	Haleakala	Pan-STARRS 1	·	1.5 km	MPC · JPL
577709	2013 OF_{3}	—	June 21, 2013	Mount Lemmon	Mount Lemmon Survey	H	390 m	MPC · JPL
577710	2013 OB_{4}	—	July 19, 2013	Haleakala	Pan-STARRS 1	H	570 m	MPC · JPL
577711	2013 OF_{6}	—	May 31, 2009	Cerro Burek	Burek, Cerro	·	1.5 km	MPC · JPL
577712	2013 OF_{10}	—	July 2, 2013	Haleakala	Pan-STARRS 1	·	1.3 km	MPC · JPL
577713	2013 OL_{10}	—	July 30, 2005	Palomar	NEAT	·	1.5 km	MPC · JPL
577714	2013 OU_{11}	—	January 7, 2016	Haleakala	Pan-STARRS 1	L5	5.9 km	MPC · JPL
577715	2013 OG_{13}	—	July 18, 2013	Haleakala	Pan-STARRS 1	HNS	1.3 km	MPC · JPL
577716	2013 OH_{13}	—	September 20, 2014	Haleakala	Pan-STARRS 1	·	700 m	MPC · JPL
577717	2013 ON_{13}	—	February 20, 2015	Haleakala	Pan-STARRS 1	H	360 m	MPC · JPL
577718	2013 OT_{13}	—	June 2, 2008	Mount Lemmon	Mount Lemmon Survey	·	1.5 km	MPC · JPL
577719	2013 OT_{14}	—	November 17, 2014	Haleakala	Pan-STARRS 1	·	1.3 km	MPC · JPL
577720	2013 PW_{1}	—	August 29, 2005	Palomar	NEAT	·	1.2 km	MPC · JPL
577721	2013 PE_{2}	—	October 25, 2001	Apache Point	SDSS Collaboration	·	880 m	MPC · JPL
577722	2013 PP_{5}	—	August 16, 2009	Kitt Peak	Spacewatch	·	950 m	MPC · JPL
577723	2013 PF_{10}	—	August 2, 2013	Haleakala	Pan-STARRS 1	APO	330 m	MPC · JPL
577724	2013 PP_{11}	—	July 9, 2013	Haleakala	Pan-STARRS 1	3:2	4.8 km	MPC · JPL
577725	2013 PJ_{13}	—	June 17, 2013	Mount Lemmon	Mount Lemmon Survey	PHO	1.1 km	MPC · JPL
577726	2013 PX_{16}	—	October 15, 2001	Apache Point	SDSS	·	2.1 km	MPC · JPL
577727	2013 PT_{20}	—	September 3, 2002	Palomar	NEAT	H	520 m	MPC · JPL
577728	2013 PN_{27}	—	October 17, 2010	Mount Lemmon	Mount Lemmon Survey	·	520 m	MPC · JPL
577729	2013 PJ_{31}	—	September 15, 2010	Les Engarouines	L. Bernasconi	·	710 m	MPC · JPL
577730	2013 PG_{32}	—	October 17, 2009	Bisei	BATTeRS	WIT	1.2 km	MPC · JPL
577731	2013 PW_{33}	—	October 23, 2009	Mount Lemmon	Mount Lemmon Survey	·	1.3 km	MPC · JPL
577732	2013 PK_{38}	—	July 30, 2005	Palomar	NEAT	·	1.0 km	MPC · JPL
577733	2013 PW_{38}	—	August 2, 2013	Haleakala	Pan-STARRS 1	H	430 m	MPC · JPL
577734	2013 PU_{39}	—	September 3, 2000	Kitt Peak	Spacewatch	·	1.6 km	MPC · JPL
577735	2013 PA_{42}	—	April 16, 2008	Mount Lemmon	Mount Lemmon Survey	·	1.0 km	MPC · JPL
577736	2013 PL_{43}	—	August 12, 2013	Palomar	Palomar Transient Factory	·	1.5 km	MPC · JPL
577737	2013 PE_{45}	—	September 11, 2001	Kitt Peak	Spacewatch	·	1.4 km	MPC · JPL
577738	2013 PP_{52}	—	July 31, 2005	Palomar	NEAT	·	1.0 km	MPC · JPL
577739	2013 PU_{57}	—	June 10, 2013	Mount Lemmon	Mount Lemmon Survey	·	1.5 km	MPC · JPL
577740	2013 PK_{64}	—	August 31, 2005	Kitt Peak	Spacewatch	·	1.3 km	MPC · JPL
577741	2013 PT_{66}	—	June 20, 2013	Haleakala	Pan-STARRS 1	H	410 m	MPC · JPL
577742	2013 PX_{72}	—	August 9, 2013	Kitt Peak	Spacewatch	·	520 m	MPC · JPL
577743	2013 PZ_{73}	—	November 13, 2005	Palomar	NEAT	(5)	1.1 km	MPC · JPL
577744	2013 PA_{74}	—	August 11, 2013	Palomar	Palomar Transient Factory	H	530 m	MPC · JPL
577745	2013 PB_{75}	—	August 12, 2013	Kitt Peak	Spacewatch	H	410 m	MPC · JPL
577746	2013 PC_{75}	—	August 12, 2013	Haleakala	Pan-STARRS 1	H	360 m	MPC · JPL
577747	2013 PK_{75}	—	August 13, 2013	Haleakala	Pan-STARRS 1	H	400 m	MPC · JPL
577748	2013 PK_{78}	—	August 14, 2013	Haleakala	Pan-STARRS 1	·	1.1 km	MPC · JPL
577749	2013 PP_{78}	—	August 18, 2009	Kitt Peak	Spacewatch	·	950 m	MPC · JPL
577750	2013 PS_{79}	—	August 8, 2013	Kitt Peak	Spacewatch	·	870 m	MPC · JPL
577751	2013 PQ_{80}	—	August 9, 2013	Haleakala	Pan-STARRS 1	·	1.5 km	MPC · JPL
577752	2013 PV_{81}	—	September 13, 2005	Kitt Peak	Spacewatch	·	810 m	MPC · JPL
577753	2013 PJ_{83}	—	August 15, 2013	Haleakala	Pan-STARRS 1	·	1.1 km	MPC · JPL
577754 Janačerbová	2013 PM_{83}	Janačerbová	August 6, 2013	Piszkéstető	T. Csörgei, K. Sárneczky	·	1.0 km	MPC · JPL
577755	2013 PZ_{83}	—	September 12, 1994	Kitt Peak	Spacewatch	·	1.0 km	MPC · JPL
577756	2013 PN_{84}	—	August 14, 2013	Haleakala	Pan-STARRS 1	·	940 m	MPC · JPL
577757	2013 PF_{85}	—	August 10, 2013	Kitt Peak	Spacewatch	·	900 m	MPC · JPL
577758	2013 PA_{102}	—	August 15, 2013	Haleakala	Pan-STARRS 1	NYS	800 m	MPC · JPL
577759	2013 PH_{106}	—	August 9, 2013	Haleakala	Pan-STARRS 1	·	1.3 km	MPC · JPL
577760	2013 PA_{108}	—	August 12, 2013	Haleakala	Pan-STARRS 1	·	880 m	MPC · JPL
577761	2013 PO_{111}	—	August 12, 2013	Haleakala	Pan-STARRS 1	·	970 m	MPC · JPL
577762	2013 PN_{112}	—	August 12, 2013	Haleakala	Pan-STARRS 1	(17392)	990 m	MPC · JPL
577763	2013 PF_{114}	—	November 17, 2009	Mount Lemmon	Mount Lemmon Survey	·	1.4 km	MPC · JPL
577764	2013 PG_{114}	—	August 15, 2013	Haleakala	Pan-STARRS 1	·	1.5 km	MPC · JPL
577765	2013 QC_{2}	—	August 16, 2013	Palomar	Palomar Transient Factory	·	1.2 km	MPC · JPL
577766	2013 QF_{5}	—	August 25, 2005	Palomar	NEAT	·	570 m	MPC · JPL
577767	2013 QH_{7}	—	September 10, 2009	Palomar	Palomar Transient Factory	MAR	1.0 km	MPC · JPL
577768	2013 QQ_{11}	—	October 23, 2003	Apache Point	SDSS Collaboration	H	480 m	MPC · JPL
577769	2013 QF_{14}	—	August 27, 2013	Haleakala	Pan-STARRS 1	MAR	650 m	MPC · JPL
577770	2013 QU_{16}	—	August 31, 2013	Elena Remote	Oreshko, A.	·	1.2 km	MPC · JPL
577771	2013 QW_{18}	—	October 2, 2006	Mount Lemmon	Mount Lemmon Survey	3:2	4.4 km	MPC · JPL
577772	2013 QX_{20}	—	September 30, 2006	Mount Lemmon	Mount Lemmon Survey	·	1.0 km	MPC · JPL
577773	2013 QH_{21}	—	January 10, 2007	Kitt Peak	Spacewatch	·	1.1 km	MPC · JPL
577774	2013 QZ_{21}	—	August 26, 2005	Palomar	NEAT	·	1.6 km	MPC · JPL
577775	2013 QM_{24}	—	August 26, 2013	Haleakala	Pan-STARRS 1	·	1.2 km	MPC · JPL
577776	2013 QD_{26}	—	August 25, 2005	Palomar	NEAT	·	1.3 km	MPC · JPL
577777	2013 QG_{27}	—	August 28, 2013	Palomar	Palomar Transient Factory	·	2.7 km	MPC · JPL
577778	2013 QH_{30}	—	August 4, 2013	Haleakala	Pan-STARRS 1	3:2	5.0 km	MPC · JPL
577779	2013 QX_{31}	—	February 27, 2012	Haleakala	Pan-STARRS 1	·	940 m	MPC · JPL
577780	2013 QO_{33}	—	August 30, 2013	Haleakala	Pan-STARRS 1	·	1.1 km	MPC · JPL
577781	2013 QT_{37}	—	August 26, 2005	Palomar	NEAT	PHO	1.1 km	MPC · JPL
577782	2013 QD_{40}	—	March 22, 2012	Mount Lemmon	Mount Lemmon Survey	MAR	670 m	MPC · JPL
577783	2013 QL_{40}	—	April 15, 2012	Haleakala	Pan-STARRS 1	·	1.3 km	MPC · JPL
577784	2013 QT_{43}	—	August 15, 2013	Haleakala	Pan-STARRS 1	·	840 m	MPC · JPL
577785	2013 QU_{44}	—	January 25, 2012	Haleakala	Pan-STARRS 1	H	380 m	MPC · JPL
577786	2013 QW_{45}	—	August 15, 2013	Haleakala	Pan-STARRS 1	·	1.3 km	MPC · JPL
577787	2013 QX_{45}	—	August 31, 2013	Haleakala	Pan-STARRS 1	HNS	900 m	MPC · JPL
577788	2013 QX_{50}	—	August 15, 2013	Haleakala	Pan-STARRS 1	WIT	730 m	MPC · JPL
577789	2013 QM_{53}	—	September 14, 2005	Kitt Peak	Spacewatch	·	1.2 km	MPC · JPL
577790	2013 QB_{54}	—	August 9, 2013	Kitt Peak	Spacewatch	·	850 m	MPC · JPL
577791	2013 QP_{55}	—	June 18, 2005	Mount Lemmon	Mount Lemmon Survey	·	1.3 km	MPC · JPL
577792	2013 QQ_{55}	—	January 31, 2003	Anderson Mesa	LONEOS	·	1.8 km	MPC · JPL
577793	2013 QX_{57}	—	September 16, 2009	Mount Lemmon	Mount Lemmon Survey	MAR	770 m	MPC · JPL
577794	2013 QF_{61}	—	August 24, 2005	Palomar	NEAT	·	890 m	MPC · JPL
577795	2013 QQ_{62}	—	July 12, 2005	Mount Lemmon	Mount Lemmon Survey	·	1.0 km	MPC · JPL
577796	2013 QZ_{68}	—	August 22, 2009	Dauban	C. Rinner, Kugel, F.	·	610 m	MPC · JPL
577797	2013 QV_{71}	—	February 6, 2011	Kitt Peak	Spacewatch	HNS	960 m	MPC · JPL
577798	2013 QR_{72}	—	November 25, 2005	Kitt Peak	Spacewatch	·	1.3 km	MPC · JPL
577799	2013 QM_{75}	—	August 27, 2013	Haleakala	Pan-STARRS 1	·	1.1 km	MPC · JPL
577800	2013 QW_{79}	—	February 23, 2012	Kitt Peak	Spacewatch	·	860 m	MPC · JPL

== 577801–577900 ==
back to top

Designation			Discovery			Properties		Ref
Permanent	Provisional	Named after	Date	Site	Discoverer(s)	Category	Diam.	Ref
577801	2013 QF_{85}	—	January 4, 2011	Mount Lemmon	Mount Lemmon Survey	·	1.1 km	MPC · JPL
577802	2013 QE_{86}	—	September 1, 2005	Kitt Peak	Spacewatch	·	960 m	MPC · JPL
577803	2013 QW_{87}	—	January 28, 2007	Kitt Peak	Spacewatch	MAR	840 m	MPC · JPL
577804	2013 QW_{89}	—	April 19, 2012	Mount Lemmon	Mount Lemmon Survey	·	840 m	MPC · JPL
577805	2013 QR_{90}	—	May 21, 2012	Haleakala	Pan-STARRS 1	3:2	3.4 km	MPC · JPL
577806	2013 QP_{92}	—	August 30, 2005	Kitt Peak	Spacewatch	·	1 km	MPC · JPL
577807	2013 QG_{93}	—	September 1, 2009	Bergisch Gladbach	W. Bickel	MAR	900 m	MPC · JPL
577808	2013 QF_{95}	—	August 12, 2013	Črni Vrh	Matičič, S.	RAF	990 m	MPC · JPL
577809	2013 RL	—	September 1, 2013	Oukaïmeden	C. Rinner	·	960 m	MPC · JPL
577810	2013 RF_{4}	—	February 12, 2011	Mount Lemmon	Mount Lemmon Survey	·	1.8 km	MPC · JPL
577811	2013 RW_{10}	—	August 9, 2013	Kitt Peak	Spacewatch	·	1.2 km	MPC · JPL
577812	2013 RN_{12}	—	November 25, 2005	Mount Lemmon	Mount Lemmon Survey	·	1.5 km	MPC · JPL
577813	2013 RZ_{13}	—	March 8, 2008	Mount Lemmon	Mount Lemmon Survey	(5)	890 m	MPC · JPL
577814	2013 RS_{14}	—	January 31, 2011	Bergisch Gladbach	W. Bickel	WIT	850 m	MPC · JPL
577815	2013 RR_{17}	—	September 4, 2000	Kitt Peak	Spacewatch	·	1.4 km	MPC · JPL
577816	2013 RC_{20}	—	March 11, 2003	Kitt Peak	Spacewatch	·	1.6 km	MPC · JPL
577817	2013 RV_{30}	—	December 1, 2005	Kitt Peak	Wasserman, L. H., Millis, R. L.	·	750 m	MPC · JPL
577818	2013 RX_{30}	—	February 10, 2011	Mount Lemmon	Mount Lemmon Survey	·	1.4 km	MPC · JPL
577819	2013 RU_{31}	—	August 26, 2013	Haleakala	Pan-STARRS 1	·	720 m	MPC · JPL
577820	2013 RF_{35}	—	September 4, 2013	Palomar	Palomar Transient Factory	·	1.7 km	MPC · JPL
577821	2013 RB_{36}	—	February 12, 2011	Mount Lemmon	Mount Lemmon Survey	·	1.2 km	MPC · JPL
577822	2013 RX_{43}	—	November 6, 2005	Great Shefford	Birtwhistle, P.	BRG	1.5 km	MPC · JPL
577823	2013 RU_{49}	—	September 10, 2013	Haleakala	Pan-STARRS 1	BRG	980 m	MPC · JPL
577824	2013 RB_{50}	—	February 7, 2011	Mount Lemmon	Mount Lemmon Survey	·	1.6 km	MPC · JPL
577825	2013 RW_{53}	—	October 31, 2005	Mauna Kea	A. Boattini	·	2.0 km	MPC · JPL
577826	2013 RJ_{54}	—	June 18, 2012	ESA OGS	ESA OGS	·	2.0 km	MPC · JPL
577827	2013 RF_{56}	—	September 6, 2013	Palomar	Palomar Transient Factory	·	1.1 km	MPC · JPL
577828	2013 RW_{56}	—	October 26, 2009	Mount Lemmon	Mount Lemmon Survey	·	1.6 km	MPC · JPL
577829	2013 RQ_{57}	—	February 12, 2008	Mount Lemmon	Mount Lemmon Survey	·	1.4 km	MPC · JPL
577830	2013 RS_{64}	—	August 14, 2013	Haleakala	Pan-STARRS 1	·	1.2 km	MPC · JPL
577831	2013 RT_{66}	—	February 4, 2002	Haleakala	NEAT	·	2.0 km	MPC · JPL
577832	2013 RG_{69}	—	November 22, 2009	Catalina	CSS	·	1.1 km	MPC · JPL
577833	2013 RU_{80}	—	February 6, 2002	Kitt Peak	Deep Ecliptic Survey	·	2.0 km	MPC · JPL
577834	2013 RO_{82}	—	January 31, 2003	Anderson Mesa	LONEOS	EUN	1.7 km	MPC · JPL
577835	2013 RT_{83}	—	October 11, 2009	Mount Lemmon	Mount Lemmon Survey	·	1.3 km	MPC · JPL
577836	2013 RO_{84}	—	September 5, 2013	Kitt Peak	Spacewatch	·	550 m	MPC · JPL
577837	2013 RP_{89}	—	September 6, 2013	Kitt Peak	Spacewatch	·	1.2 km	MPC · JPL
577838	2013 RQ_{91}	—	January 27, 2007	Mount Lemmon	Mount Lemmon Survey	·	1.1 km	MPC · JPL
577839	2013 RM_{94}	—	September 14, 2013	Palomar	Palomar Transient Factory	·	1.5 km	MPC · JPL
577840	2013 RV_{97}	—	September 2, 2013	Palomar	Palomar Transient Factory	GEF	1.2 km	MPC · JPL
577841	2013 RV_{98}	—	September 3, 2013	Calar Alto	F. Hormuth	L5	6.9 km	MPC · JPL
577842	2013 RZ_{98}	—	August 28, 2000	Cerro Tololo	Deep Ecliptic Survey	L5	6.9 km	MPC · JPL
577843	2013 RM_{103}	—	September 15, 2013	Mount Lemmon	Mount Lemmon Survey	·	1.2 km	MPC · JPL
577844	2013 RU_{103}	—	September 4, 2000	Kitt Peak	Spacewatch	·	1.6 km	MPC · JPL
577845	2013 RN_{107}	—	November 21, 2005	Kitt Peak	Spacewatch	·	1.2 km	MPC · JPL
577846	2013 RA_{108}	—	September 6, 2013	Črni Vrh	Mikuž, H.	·	1.3 km	MPC · JPL
577847	2013 RX_{109}	—	September 14, 2013	Mount Lemmon	Mount Lemmon Survey	·	770 m	MPC · JPL
577848	2013 RG_{111}	—	December 1, 2014	Haleakala	Pan-STARRS 1	MAR	800 m	MPC · JPL
577849	2013 RJ_{115}	—	September 13, 2013	Mount Lemmon	Mount Lemmon Survey	·	2.3 km	MPC · JPL
577850	2013 RZ_{124}	—	September 15, 2013	Mount Lemmon	Mount Lemmon Survey	EUN	970 m	MPC · JPL
577851	2013 RA_{127}	—	March 7, 2016	Haleakala	Pan-STARRS 1	·	1.1 km	MPC · JPL
577852	2013 RB_{131}	—	September 2, 2013	Mount Lemmon	Mount Lemmon Survey	HNS	960 m	MPC · JPL
577853	2013 RF_{132}	—	September 14, 2013	Haleakala	Pan-STARRS 1	L5	6.6 km	MPC · JPL
577854	2013 RV_{133}	—	September 15, 2013	Mount Lemmon	Mount Lemmon Survey	·	1.3 km	MPC · JPL
577855	2013 RT_{148}	—	September 14, 2013	Kitt Peak	Spacewatch	·	1.5 km	MPC · JPL
577856	2013 RU_{148}	—	September 9, 2013	Haleakala	Pan-STARRS 1	AGN	1 km	MPC · JPL
577857	2013 RA_{149}	—	September 3, 2013	Mount Lemmon	Mount Lemmon Survey	·	1.5 km	MPC · JPL
577858	2013 SY_{1}	—	September 29, 2009	Kitt Peak	Spacewatch	·	1.4 km	MPC · JPL
577859	2013 SC_{3}	—	October 24, 2005	Mauna Kea	A. Boattini	·	2.0 km	MPC · JPL
577860	2013 SU_{3}	—	January 24, 2015	Haleakala	Pan-STARRS 1	MAR	980 m	MPC · JPL
577861	2013 SX_{3}	—	February 20, 2006	Catalina	CSS	H	470 m	MPC · JPL
577862	2013 SL_{4}	—	December 5, 2010	Mount Lemmon	Mount Lemmon Survey	·	2.0 km	MPC · JPL
577863	2013 SV_{4}	—	September 17, 2013	Mount Lemmon	Mount Lemmon Survey	MAR	700 m	MPC · JPL
577864	2013 SQ_{20}	—	September 29, 2005	Catalina	CSS	H	510 m	MPC · JPL
577865	2013 SV_{23}	—	May 27, 2012	Mount Lemmon	Mount Lemmon Survey	·	1.3 km	MPC · JPL
577866	2013 SX_{25}	—	September 28, 2013	Oukaïmeden	C. Rinner	·	1.5 km	MPC · JPL
577867	2013 SX_{28}	—	September 30, 2013	Oukaïmeden	C. Rinner	·	1.4 km	MPC · JPL
577868	2013 SU_{29}	—	February 10, 2004	Nogales	P. R. Holvorcem, M. Schwartz	·	1.0 km	MPC · JPL
577869	2013 SU_{31}	—	February 25, 2011	Mount Lemmon	Mount Lemmon Survey	·	1.6 km	MPC · JPL
577870	2013 SK_{32}	—	July 17, 2001	Palomar	NEAT	·	1.0 km	MPC · JPL
577871	2013 SB_{33}	—	September 1, 2013	Mount Lemmon	Mount Lemmon Survey	·	1.6 km	MPC · JPL
577872	2013 SD_{33}	—	November 1, 2005	Socorro	LINEAR	·	1.5 km	MPC · JPL
577873	2013 SE_{33}	—	September 6, 2013	Mount Lemmon	Mount Lemmon Survey	·	1.3 km	MPC · JPL
577874	2013 SN_{34}	—	September 1, 2013	Mount Lemmon	Mount Lemmon Survey	·	1.5 km	MPC · JPL
577875	2013 SW_{36}	—	September 1, 2013	Mount Lemmon	Mount Lemmon Survey	615	960 m	MPC · JPL
577876	2013 SO_{37}	—	September 18, 2009	Kitt Peak	Spacewatch	(5)	900 m	MPC · JPL
577877	2013 SF_{39}	—	April 12, 2012	Haleakala	Pan-STARRS 1	·	1.3 km	MPC · JPL
577878	2013 ST_{39}	—	March 4, 2008	Mount Lemmon	Mount Lemmon Survey	L5	10 km	MPC · JPL
577879	2013 SW_{42}	—	November 8, 2009	Catalina	CSS	RAF	1 km	MPC · JPL
577880	2013 SZ_{43}	—	August 15, 2013	Haleakala	Pan-STARRS 1	·	1.5 km	MPC · JPL
577881 Pálinkáslibor	2013 SB_{44}	Pálinkáslibor	September 27, 2013	Piszkéstető	T. Csörgei, K. Sárneczky	EUN	1.1 km	MPC · JPL
577882	2013 SJ_{44}	—	October 17, 2009	Mayhill	Lowe, A.	·	1.4 km	MPC · JPL
577883 Yelenametyolkina	2013 SW_{44}	Yelenametyolkina	August 30, 2009	Zelenchukskaya Station	T. V. Krjačko, B. Satovski	HNS	1.2 km	MPC · JPL
577884	2013 SM_{47}	—	March 6, 2002	Palomar	NEAT	·	2.4 km	MPC · JPL
577885	2013 SH_{48}	—	March 2, 2009	Mount Lemmon	Mount Lemmon Survey	·	600 m	MPC · JPL
577886	2013 SD_{49}	—	September 28, 2013	Mount Lemmon	Mount Lemmon Survey	·	1.3 km	MPC · JPL
577887	2013 SY_{49}	—	March 10, 2007	Mount Lemmon	Mount Lemmon Survey	·	1.0 km	MPC · JPL
577888	2013 SD_{51}	—	September 28, 2013	Haleakala	Pan-STARRS 1	·	1.2 km	MPC · JPL
577889	2013 SU_{65}	—	April 4, 2008	Kitt Peak	Spacewatch	·	1.0 km	MPC · JPL
577890	2013 SE_{66}	—	August 25, 2004	Kitt Peak	Spacewatch	HNS	1.0 km	MPC · JPL
577891	2013 SR_{67}	—	December 3, 2005	Mauna Kea	A. Boattini	·	2.0 km	MPC · JPL
577892	2013 SO_{71}	—	September 18, 2009	Kitt Peak	Spacewatch	·	880 m	MPC · JPL
577893	2013 SZ_{71}	—	January 28, 2011	Catalina	CSS	·	1.6 km	MPC · JPL
577894	2013 SM_{81}	—	April 14, 2007	Mount Lemmon	Mount Lemmon Survey	WIT	1.3 km	MPC · JPL
577895	2013 SC_{82}	—	February 4, 2003	Anderson Mesa	LONEOS	(194)	2.3 km	MPC · JPL
577896	2013 SA_{93}	—	March 13, 2007	Kitt Peak	Spacewatch	·	1.5 km	MPC · JPL
577897	2013 SD_{96}	—	November 9, 2009	Mount Lemmon	Mount Lemmon Survey	·	1.7 km	MPC · JPL
577898	2013 SC_{102}	—	September 28, 2013	Piszkéstető	K. Sárneczky	EUN	950 m	MPC · JPL
577899	2013 SY_{102}	—	September 30, 2013	Mount Lemmon	Mount Lemmon Survey	·	1.8 km	MPC · JPL
577900	2013 SC_{103}	—	May 5, 2016	Mount Lemmon	Mount Lemmon Survey	HNS	750 m	MPC · JPL

== 577901–578000 ==
back to top

Designation			Discovery			Properties		Ref
Permanent	Provisional	Named after	Date	Site	Discoverer(s)	Category	Diam.	Ref
577901	2013 SJ_{103}	—	September 28, 2013	Piszkés-tető	K. Sárneczky, S. Kürti	EUN	1.2 km	MPC · JPL
577902	2013 TF_{1}	—	September 6, 2013	Kitt Peak	Spacewatch	·	1.2 km	MPC · JPL
577903	2013 TX_{1}	—	October 1, 2013	Palomar	Palomar Transient Factory	EUN	1.3 km	MPC · JPL
577904	2013 TD_{11}	—	September 2, 2013	Catalina	CSS	·	1.3 km	MPC · JPL
577905	2013 TJ_{11}	—	March 11, 2003	Palomar	NEAT	·	1.9 km	MPC · JPL
577906	2013 TT_{11}	—	October 4, 2013	Palomar	Palomar Transient Factory	EUN	1.3 km	MPC · JPL
577907	2013 TW_{16}	—	September 24, 2000	Kitt Peak	Spacewatch	JUN	880 m	MPC · JPL
577908	2013 TY_{17}	—	January 30, 2006	Kitt Peak	Spacewatch	HOF	2.1 km	MPC · JPL
577909	2013 TK_{18}	—	October 1, 2013	Kitt Peak	Spacewatch	·	1.0 km	MPC · JPL
577910	2013 TE_{22}	—	March 10, 2003	Palomar	NEAT	·	1.3 km	MPC · JPL
577911	2013 TB_{26}	—	May 12, 2007	Mount Lemmon	Mount Lemmon Survey	·	1.5 km	MPC · JPL
577912	2013 TJ_{28}	—	September 17, 2013	Mount Lemmon	Mount Lemmon Survey	·	2.2 km	MPC · JPL
577913	2013 TP_{31}	—	December 19, 2004	Mount Lemmon	Mount Lemmon Survey	L5	10 km	MPC · JPL
577914	2013 TF_{32}	—	August 31, 2013	Haleakala	Pan-STARRS 1	·	880 m	MPC · JPL
577915	2013 TO_{34}	—	March 10, 2011	Kitt Peak	Spacewatch	·	1.9 km	MPC · JPL
577916	2013 TC_{36}	—	October 2, 2013	Palomar	Palomar Transient Factory	·	1.4 km	MPC · JPL
577917	2013 TT_{37}	—	September 17, 2009	Mount Lemmon	Mount Lemmon Survey	·	1.1 km	MPC · JPL
577918	2013 TY_{37}	—	October 2, 2013	Mount Lemmon	Mount Lemmon Survey	·	1.4 km	MPC · JPL
577919	2013 TJ_{41}	—	October 2, 2013	Mount Lemmon	Mount Lemmon Survey	·	1.2 km	MPC · JPL
577920	2013 TL_{44}	—	September 13, 2013	Mount Lemmon	Mount Lemmon Survey	·	1.1 km	MPC · JPL
577921	2013 TG_{45}	—	March 20, 2007	Mount Lemmon	Mount Lemmon Survey	·	1.7 km	MPC · JPL
577922	2013 TX_{54}	—	January 10, 2006	Kitt Peak	Spacewatch	·	1.6 km	MPC · JPL
577923	2013 TL_{57}	—	September 9, 2008	Mount Lemmon	Mount Lemmon Survey	·	1.5 km	MPC · JPL
577924	2013 TW_{64}	—	April 1, 2011	Mount Lemmon	Mount Lemmon Survey	·	1.5 km	MPC · JPL
577925	2013 TJ_{76}	—	November 5, 1999	Kitt Peak	Spacewatch	AGN	1.3 km	MPC · JPL
577926	2013 TL_{77}	—	April 1, 2012	Mount Lemmon	Mount Lemmon Survey	·	1.1 km	MPC · JPL
577927	2013 TQ_{79}	—	November 24, 2008	Kitt Peak	Spacewatch	H	500 m	MPC · JPL
577928	2013 TH_{81}	—	October 1, 2013	Mount Lemmon	Mount Lemmon Survey	·	1.6 km	MPC · JPL
577929	2013 TN_{88}	—	October 1, 2013	Kitt Peak	Spacewatch	·	1.3 km	MPC · JPL
577930	2013 TG_{97}	—	October 2, 2013	Kitt Peak	Spacewatch	MAR	700 m	MPC · JPL
577931	2013 TD_{103}	—	October 2, 2013	Mount Lemmon	Mount Lemmon Survey	L5	7.4 km	MPC · JPL
577932	2013 TO_{103}	—	October 3, 2013	Kitt Peak	Spacewatch	EUN	1.0 km	MPC · JPL
577933	2013 TP_{105}	—	September 28, 2013	Piszkéstető	K. Sárneczky	·	2.0 km	MPC · JPL
577934	2013 TK_{107}	—	September 12, 2004	Kitt Peak	Spacewatch	·	1.5 km	MPC · JPL
577935	2013 TX_{110}	—	July 29, 2008	Mount Lemmon	Mount Lemmon Survey	WIT	960 m	MPC · JPL
577936	2013 TG_{113}	—	October 10, 2004	Kitt Peak	Deep Ecliptic Survey	AST	1.4 km	MPC · JPL
577937	2013 TF_{116}	—	April 2, 2011	Mount Lemmon	Mount Lemmon Survey	·	1.6 km	MPC · JPL
577938	2013 TG_{116}	—	October 26, 2009	Kitt Peak	Spacewatch	·	1.1 km	MPC · JPL
577939	2013 TU_{119}	—	September 17, 2009	Kitt Peak	Spacewatch	·	870 m	MPC · JPL
577940	2013 TP_{125}	—	January 22, 2006	Mount Lemmon	Mount Lemmon Survey	·	1.5 km	MPC · JPL
577941	2013 TG_{129}	—	October 6, 2013	Oukaïmeden	C. Rinner	·	1.5 km	MPC · JPL
577942	2013 TA_{131}	—	October 8, 2013	Cala d'Hort	Observatiorio Cala d'Hort	·	1.1 km	MPC · JPL
577943	2013 TK_{131}	—	October 8, 2013	Palomar	Palomar Transient Factory	EUN	1.1 km	MPC · JPL
577944	2013 TP_{131}	—	October 9, 2013	Elena Remote	Oreshko, A.	·	1.6 km	MPC · JPL
577945	2013 TZ_{137}	—	March 14, 2007	Mount Lemmon	Mount Lemmon Survey	·	1.5 km	MPC · JPL
577946	2013 TK_{141}	—	February 21, 2003	Palomar	NEAT	·	1.6 km	MPC · JPL
577947	2013 TN_{145}	—	October 15, 2013	Catalina	CSS	JUN	1.0 km	MPC · JPL
577948	2013 TC_{158}	—	April 5, 2011	Mount Lemmon	Mount Lemmon Survey	MRX	810 m	MPC · JPL
577949	2013 TD_{158}	—	November 9, 2013	Haleakala	Pan-STARRS 1	·	1.3 km	MPC · JPL
577950	2013 TH_{160}	—	October 8, 2013	Mount Lemmon	Mount Lemmon Survey	H	320 m	MPC · JPL
577951	2013 TJ_{163}	—	October 3, 2013	Kitt Peak	Spacewatch	·	1.6 km	MPC · JPL
577952	2013 TK_{164}	—	October 2, 2013	Kitt Peak	Spacewatch	·	1.3 km	MPC · JPL
577953	2013 TP_{164}	—	October 3, 2013	Haleakala	Pan-STARRS 1	·	1.5 km	MPC · JPL
577954	2013 TU_{164}	—	October 9, 2013	Mount Lemmon	Mount Lemmon Survey	·	1.2 km	MPC · JPL
577955	2013 TB_{165}	—	May 18, 2002	Palomar	NEAT	·	2.9 km	MPC · JPL
577956	2013 TH_{168}	—	October 3, 2013	Haleakala	Pan-STARRS 1	·	1.5 km	MPC · JPL
577957	2013 TP_{169}	—	September 17, 2009	Kitt Peak	Spacewatch	·	1.0 km	MPC · JPL
577958	2013 TR_{169}	—	September 9, 2004	Kitt Peak	Spacewatch	·	1.2 km	MPC · JPL
577959	2013 TD_{170}	—	August 27, 2000	Cerro Tololo	Deep Ecliptic Survey	·	1.1 km	MPC · JPL
577960	2013 TP_{172}	—	October 3, 2013	Haleakala	Pan-STARRS 1	·	1.5 km	MPC · JPL
577961	2013 TQ_{172}	—	October 7, 2013	Nogales	M. Schwartz, P. R. Holvorcem	·	1.3 km	MPC · JPL
577962	2013 TS_{172}	—	October 7, 2013	Mount Lemmon	Mount Lemmon Survey	·	1.5 km	MPC · JPL
577963	2013 TA_{173}	—	October 14, 2013	Mount Lemmon	Mount Lemmon Survey	·	2.2 km	MPC · JPL
577964	2013 TC_{173}	—	December 12, 2004	Kitt Peak	Spacewatch	DOR	2.4 km	MPC · JPL
577965	2013 TB_{174}	—	October 5, 2013	Haleakala	Pan-STARRS 1	·	1.6 km	MPC · JPL
577966	2013 TO_{180}	—	October 5, 2013	Haleakala	Pan-STARRS 1	EUN	1.1 km	MPC · JPL
577967	2013 TU_{180}	—	October 3, 2013	Haleakala	Pan-STARRS 1	HNS	1.0 km	MPC · JPL
577968	2013 TC_{182}	—	February 20, 2015	Haleakala	Pan-STARRS 1	·	950 m	MPC · JPL
577969	2013 TX_{185}	—	September 6, 2008	Kitt Peak	Spacewatch	·	1.2 km	MPC · JPL
577970	2013 TU_{189}	—	October 1, 2013	Mount Lemmon	Mount Lemmon Survey	·	1.4 km	MPC · JPL
577971	2013 TC_{193}	—	October 5, 2013	Haleakala	Pan-STARRS 1	L5	6.4 km	MPC · JPL
577972	2013 TT_{193}	—	October 2, 2013	Mount Lemmon	Mount Lemmon Survey	KOR	1.0 km	MPC · JPL
577973	2013 TX_{195}	—	October 1, 2013	Kitt Peak	Spacewatch	L5	8.8 km	MPC · JPL
577974	2013 TT_{196}	—	October 7, 2013	Mount Lemmon	Mount Lemmon Survey	·	1.8 km	MPC · JPL
577975	2013 TS_{198}	—	October 3, 2013	Kitt Peak	Spacewatch	·	1.5 km	MPC · JPL
577976	2013 TH_{199}	—	October 5, 2013	Haleakala	Pan-STARRS 1	·	1.3 km	MPC · JPL
577977	2013 TT_{200}	—	October 15, 2013	Kitt Peak	Spacewatch	·	1.3 km	MPC · JPL
577978	2013 TV_{200}	—	October 9, 2013	Mount Lemmon	Mount Lemmon Survey	L5	8.0 km	MPC · JPL
577979	2013 TC_{204}	—	October 4, 2013	Catalina	CSS	EUN	1.2 km	MPC · JPL
577980	2013 TW_{204}	—	October 3, 2013	Haleakala	Pan-STARRS 1	·	1.4 km	MPC · JPL
577981	2013 UL	—	December 10, 2005	Catalina	CSS	H	620 m	MPC · JPL
577982	2013 UY_{6}	—	September 17, 2013	Mount Lemmon	Mount Lemmon Survey	·	2.1 km	MPC · JPL
577983	2013 UG_{8}	—	October 3, 2013	Haleakala	Pan-STARRS 1	·	1.1 km	MPC · JPL
577984	2013 UL_{8}	—	September 5, 2008	Kitt Peak	Spacewatch	·	1.7 km	MPC · JPL
577985	2013 UB_{11}	—	October 8, 2013	Haleakala	Pan-STARRS 1	ADE	1.5 km	MPC · JPL
577986	2013 UJ_{11}	—	September 28, 2013	Piszkéstető	K. Sárneczky	·	1.6 km	MPC · JPL
577987	2013 UG_{13}	—	August 26, 2000	Kitt Peak	Spacewatch	·	1.4 km	MPC · JPL
577988	2013 UO_{16}	—	October 30, 2013	Haleakala	Pan-STARRS 1	·	1.9 km	MPC · JPL
577989	2013 UH_{18}	—	May 27, 2012	Mount Lemmon	Mount Lemmon Survey	(5)	1.1 km	MPC · JPL
577990	2013 UK_{19}	—	October 27, 2013	Kitt Peak	Spacewatch	MAR	980 m	MPC · JPL
577991	2013 UL_{19}	—	September 17, 2003	Kitt Peak	Spacewatch	HOF	2.8 km	MPC · JPL
577992	2013 UZ_{19}	—	October 24, 2013	Mount Lemmon	Mount Lemmon Survey	·	1.3 km	MPC · JPL
577993	2013 UG_{20}	—	October 25, 2013	Kitt Peak	Spacewatch	·	1.1 km	MPC · JPL
577994	2013 UK_{20}	—	April 14, 2002	Kitt Peak	Spacewatch	·	1.2 km	MPC · JPL
577995	2013 UR_{20}	—	April 29, 2012	Mount Lemmon	Mount Lemmon Survey	·	960 m	MPC · JPL
577996	2013 US_{20}	—	October 25, 2013	Mount Lemmon	Mount Lemmon Survey	·	1.2 km	MPC · JPL
577997	2013 UV_{20}	—	October 25, 2013	Kitt Peak	Spacewatch	HNS	1.1 km	MPC · JPL
577998	2013 UH_{22}	—	October 26, 2013	Mount Lemmon	Mount Lemmon Survey	·	1.6 km	MPC · JPL
577999	2013 UU_{22}	—	October 30, 2013	Haleakala	Pan-STARRS 1	·	1.9 km	MPC · JPL
578000	2013 UX_{22}	—	October 24, 2013	Mount Lemmon	Mount Lemmon Survey	(5)	900 m	MPC · JPL

back to top

== Meaning of names ==
As minor planet discoveries are confirmed, they are given a permanent number by the IAU's Minor Planet Center (MPC), and the discoverers can then submit names for them, following the IAU's naming conventions. The list below concerns those minor planets in the specified number-range that have received names, and explains the meanings of those names.

Official naming citations of newly named small Solar System bodies are approved and published in a bulletin by IAU's Working Group for Small Bodies Nomenclature (WGSBN). Before May 2021, citations were published in MPC's Minor Planet Circulars for many decades. Recent citations can also be found on the JPL Small-Body Database (SBDB). Until his death in 2016, German astronomer Lutz D. Schmadel compiled these citations into the Dictionary of Minor Planet Names (DMP) and regularly updated the collection.

Based on Paul Herget's The Names of the Minor Planets, Schmadel also researched the unclear origin of numerous asteroids, most of which had been named prior to World War II. This article incorporates text from this source, which is in the public domain: SBDB New namings may only be added to this list below after official publication as the preannouncement of names is condemned. The WGSBN publishes a comprehensive guideline for the naming rules of non-cometary small Solar System bodies.

Named minor planet	Provisional	This minor planet was named for...	Ref · Catalog
577754 Janačerbová	2013 PM_{83}	Jana Čerbová, Slovak meteorologist.	IAU · 577754
577881 Pálinkáslibor	2013 SB_{44}	Libor Pálinkás (born 1965), a Slovak amateur astronomer and observer of deep-sky objects in particular.	IAU · 577881
577883 Yelenametyolkina	2013 SW_{44}	Yelena Vladimirovna Metyolkina (born 1953), Russian actress.	IAU · 577883
