= EPRB =

EPRB may refer to:

- A version of the EPR paradox, formulated by David Bohm, sometimes called the EPRB paradox
- Emergency Position-Indicating Radio Beacon, most commonly abbreviated EPIRB
