= Growth of knowledge =

In Karl Popper's philosophy, the main problem of methodology and philosophy of science is to explain and promote the growth of knowledge. To this purpose, Popper advocated his theory of falsifiability, testability and testing. He wrote in The Logic of Scientific Discovery: "The central problem of epistemology has always been and still is the problem of the growth of knowledge. And the growth of knowledge can be studied best by studying the growth of scientific knowledge."

== See also ==
- Evolutionary epistemology § Growth of knowledge
- Scientific progress
- Scientometrics
