= Karl Popper =

Austrian–British philosopher of science (1902–1994)

Sir Karl Popper CH FRS FBA
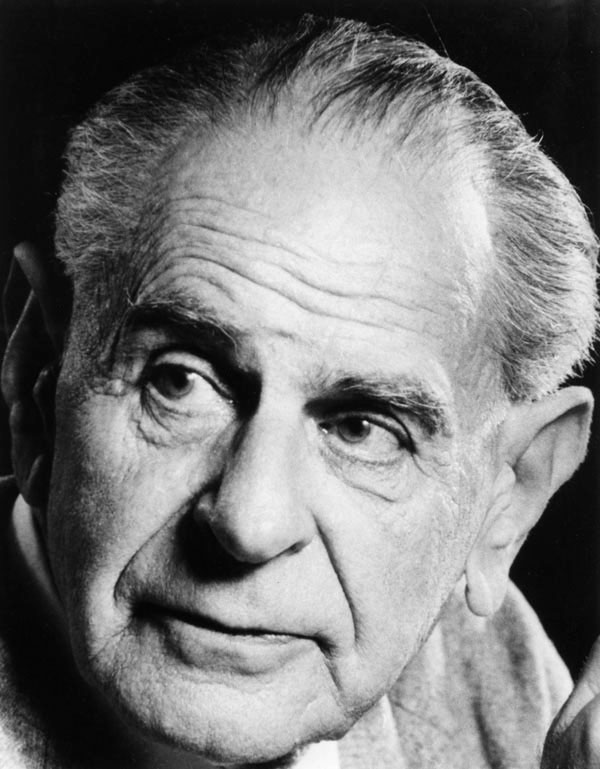
- Popper in the 1980s
- Born: Karl Raimund Popper; 28 July 1902; Vienna, Austria-Hungary
- Died: 17 September 1994 (aged 92); London, England
- Resting place: Lainzer Friedhof, Vienna, Austria
- Citizenship: Austria; United Kingdom (from 1945)
- Spouse: Josefine Anna Henniger (m. 1930; died 1985)
- Relatives: Josef Popper-Lynkeus (uncle)
- Awards: Knight Bachelor (1965)

Education
- Education: University of Vienna (PhD, 1928)
- Thesis: Zur Methodenfrage der Denkpsychologie (On Questions of Method in the Psychology of Thinking) (1928)
- Doctoral advisor: Karl Ludwig Bühler; Moritz Schlick
- Other advisor: Hans Hahn

Philosophical work
- Era: 20th-century philosophy
- Region: Western philosophy
- School: Analytic philosophy; Critical rationalism; Würzburg School; Metaphysical realism; Correspondence theory of truth; Interactionism; Liberalism
- Institutions: Canterbury University College; London School of Economics; King's College London; Darwin College, Cambridge
- Doctoral students: Joseph Agassi; Charles Leonard Hamblin; Alan Musgrave; A. I. Sabra
- Notable students: Donald A. Gillies; George Soros; John W. N. Watkins
- Main interests: Epistemology; Rationality; Philosophy of science; Logic; Social and political philosophy; Metaphysics; Philosophy of mind; Origin of life; Interpretations of quantum mechanics
- Notable ideas: See list: Bold hypothesis; Critical rationalism; Falsifiability; Criticism of dogmatic/naive falsificationism; Demarcation problem; Evolutionary trial and error view of the growth of knowledge; Propensity interpretation; Open society; Popper's three worlds; Modified essentialism; Criticism of justificationism; Axiomatization of probability; Popper's experiment; Active Darwinism; Spearhead model of evolution; Criticism of psychoanalysis; Situational logic; Objective hermeneutics; The paradox of tolerance; Critical dualism (of facts and standards); Logic of scientific discovery; Experimental corroboration as an indicator of verisimilitude/truthlikeness; Basissatz (basic statement); The historicism–historism distinction; Negative utilitarianism; Popper's two senses of number statements; The "Myth of the Framework"

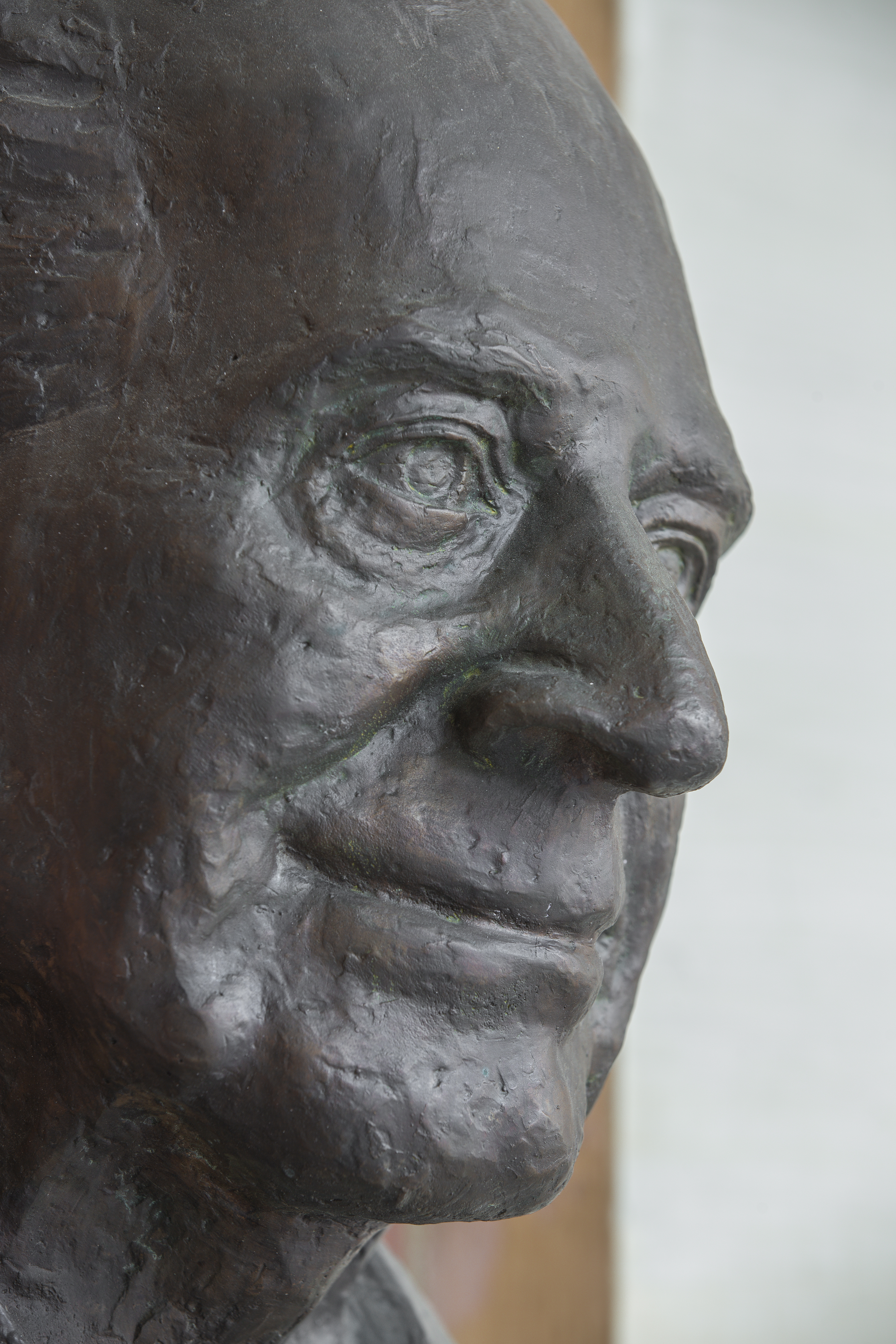
Popper bust in the Arkadenhof of the University of Vienna

Sir Karl Raimund Popper (28 July 1902 – 17 September 1994) was an Austrian–British philosopher, academic and social commentator. One of the 20th century's most influential philosophers of science, Popper is known for his rejection of the classical inductivist views on the scientific method in favour of empirical falsification made possible by his falsifiability criterion, and for founding the Department of Philosophy at the London School of Economics and Political Science. According to Popper, a theory in the empirical sciences can never be proven, but it can be falsified, meaning that it can (and should) be scrutinised with decisive experiments. Popper was opposed to the classical justificationist account of knowledge, which he replaced with "the first non-justificational philosophy of criticism in the history of philosophy", namely critical rationalism.

In political discourse, he is known for his vigorous defence of liberal democracy and the principles of social criticism that he believed made a flourishing open society possible. His political thought resides within the camp of Enlightenment rationalism and humanism. He was a dogged opponent of totalitarianism, communism, nationalism, fascism, historicism, and other kinds of (in Popper's view) reactionary and irrational ideas, and identified modern liberal democracies as the best-to-date embodiment of an open society.

== Life and career ==
=== Family and training ===
Karl Popper was born in Vienna (then in Austria-Hungary) in 1902 to upper-middle-class parents. All of Popper's grandparents were assimilated Jews; the Popper family converted to Lutheranism before he was born and so he received a Lutheran baptism. His father, Simon Siegmund Carl Popper (1856–1932), was a lawyer from Bohemia and a doctor of law at the Vienna University. His mother, Jenny Schiff (1864–1938), was an accomplished pianist of Silesian and Hungarian descent. Popper's uncle was the Austrian philosopher Josef Popper-Lynkeus. After establishing themselves in Vienna, the Poppers made a rapid social climb in Viennese society, as Popper's father became a partner in the law firm of Vienna's liberal mayor Raimund Grübl, and after Grübl's death in 1898 took over the business. Popper received his middle name after Raimund Grübl. (In his autobiography, Popper erroneously recalls that Grübl's first name was Carl). His parents were close friends of Sigmund Freud's sister Rosa Graf. His father was a bibliophile who had 12,000–14,000 volumes in his personal library and took an interest in philosophy, the classics, and social and political issues. Popper inherited both the library and the disposition from him. Later, he would describe the atmosphere of his upbringing as having been "decidedly bookish".

Popper left the Realgymnasium at the age of 16 and began attending lectures in mathematics, physics, philosophy, psychology and the history of music as a guest student at the University of Vienna. In 1919, Popper became attracted by Marxism and subsequently joined the Association of Socialist School Students. He also became a member of the Social Democratic Workers' Party of Austria, which was at that time a party that fully adopted Marxism. After the street battle in the Hörlgasse on 15 June 1919, when police shot eight of his unarmed party comrades, he turned away from what he saw as the philosopher Karl Marx's historical materialism, abandoned the ideology, and remained a supporter of social liberalism throughout his life.

Popper worked in street construction for a short time but was unable to cope with the heavy labour. Continuing to attend university as a guest student, he started an apprenticeship as a cabinetmaker, which he completed as a journeyman. He was dreaming at that time of starting a daycare facility for children, for which he assumed the ability to make furniture might be useful. After that, he did voluntary service in one of psychoanalyst Alfred Adler's clinics for children. In 1922, he did his matura by way of a second chance education and finally joined the university as an ordinary student. He completed his examination as a primary school teacher in 1924 and started working at an after-school care club for socially endangered children. In 1925, he went to the newly founded Pädagogisches Institut and continued studying philosophy and psychology. Around that time he started courting Josefine Anna Henninger, who later became his wife.

In 1928, Popper earned a doctorate in psychology, under the supervision of Karl Bühler—with Moritz Schlick being the second chair of the thesis committee. His dissertation was titled Zur Methodenfrage der Denkpsychologie (On Questions of Method in the Psychology of Thinking). In 1929, he obtained an authorisation to teach mathematics and physics in secondary school and began doing so. He married his colleague Josefine Anna Henninger (1906–1985) in 1930. Fearing the rise of Nazism and the threat of the Anschluss, he started to use the evenings and the nights to write his first book Die beiden Grundprobleme der Erkenntnistheorie (The Two Fundamental Problems of the Theory of Knowledge). He needed to publish a book to get an academic position in a country that was safe for people of Jewish descent. In the end, he did not publish the two-volume work; but instead, a condensed version with some new material, as Logik der Forschung (The Logic of Scientific Discovery) in 1934. Here, he criticised psychologism, naturalism, inductivism, and logical positivism, and put forth his theory of potential falsifiability as the criterion demarcating science from non-science. In 1935 and 1936, he took unpaid leave to go to the United Kingdom for a study visit.

=== Academic life ===
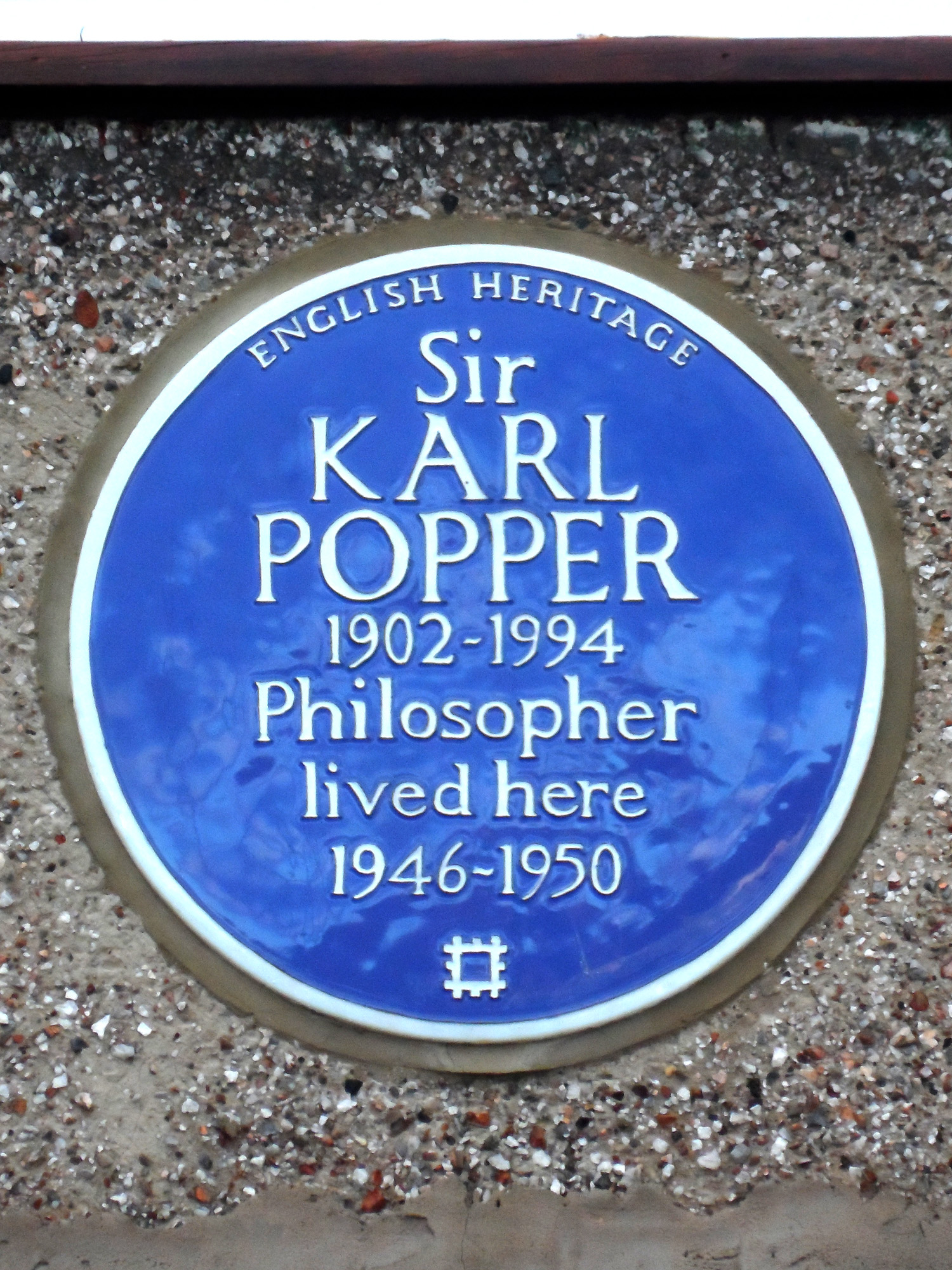
English Heritage blue plaque at Burlington Rise, Oakleigh Park, London

In 1937, Popper finally managed to get a position that allowed him to emigrate to New Zealand, where he became lecturer in philosophy at Canterbury University College of the University of New Zealand in Christchurch. It was here that he wrote his influential work The Open Society and Its Enemies. In Dunedin he met the Professor of Physiology John Carew Eccles and formed a lifelong friendship with him. In 1946, after the Second World War, he moved to the United Kingdom to become a reader in logic and scientific method at the London School of Economics (LSE), a constituent School of the University of London, where, three years later, in 1949, he was appointed professor of logic and scientific method. Popper was president of the Aristotelian Society from 1958 to 1959. He resided in Penn, Buckinghamshire.

Popper was involved in the positivism dispute about the methodology of the social sciences during the 1960s, critical of the Frankfurt School (Theodor Adorno, Jürgen Habermas). He retired from academic life in 1969, though he remained intellectually active for the rest of his life. In 1985, he returned to Austria so that his wife could have her relatives around her during the last months of her life; she died in November that year. After the Ludwig Boltzmann Gesellschaft failed to establish him as the director of a newly founded branch researching the philosophy of science, he went back again to the United Kingdom in 1986, settling in Kenley, Surrey.

=== Personal life and death ===
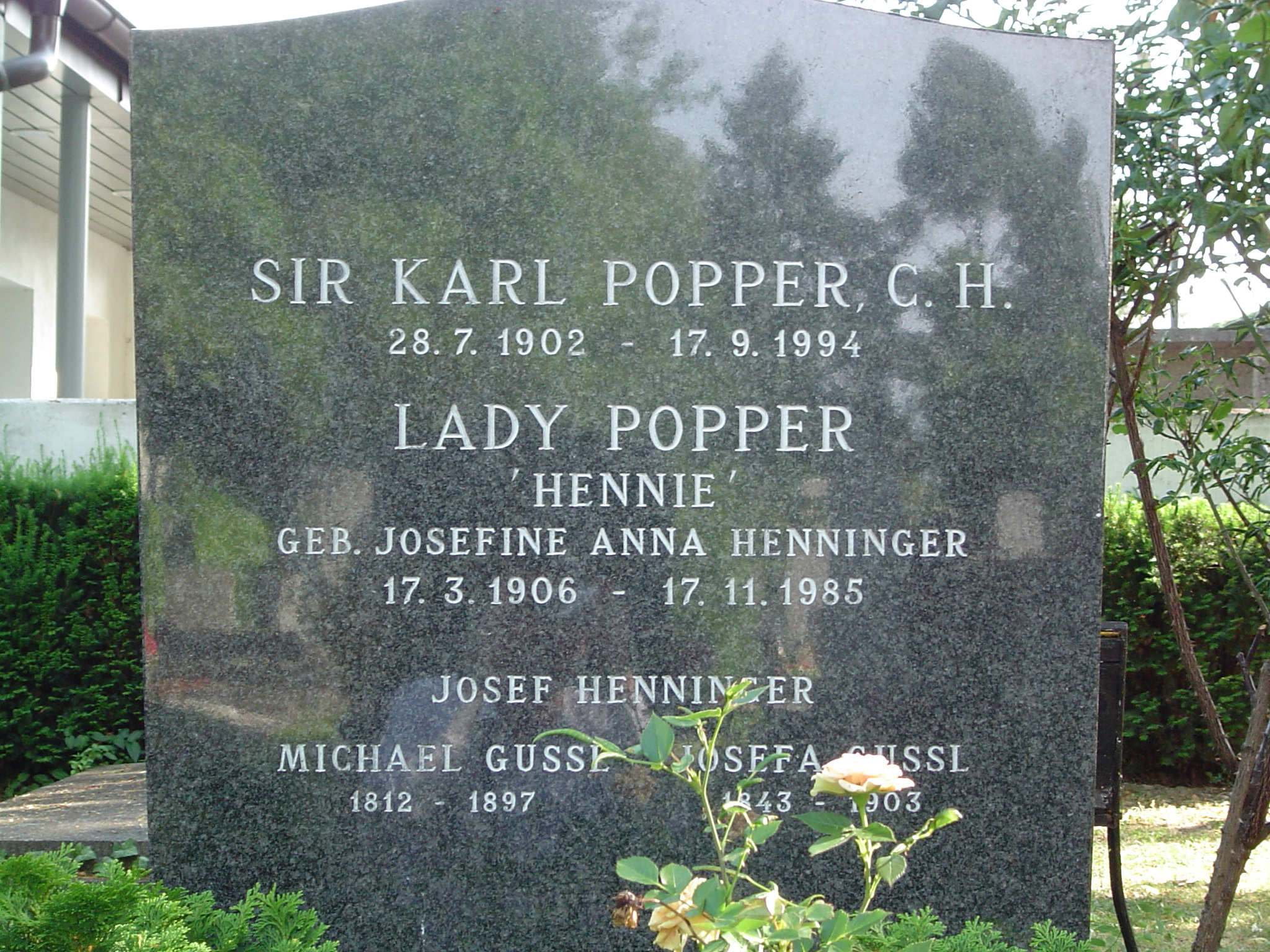
Popper's gravesite in Lainzer Friedhof in Vienna, Austria

Popper was married to Josefine Anna Henninger. They chose not to have children because of the circumstances of war in the early years of their marriage. Popper commented that this "was perhaps a cowardly but in a way a right decision".

Popper died of "complications of cancer, pneumonia and kidney failure" in Kenley at the age of 92 on 17 September 1994. He had been working continuously on his philosophy until two weeks before when he suddenly fell terminally ill, writing his last letter two weeks before his death as well.

After cremation, his ashes were taken to Vienna and buried at Lainzer cemetery adjacent to the ORF Centre, where his wife Josefine Anna Popper (called "Hennie") had already been buried.

=== Posthumous ===
Popper's estate is managed by his secretary and personal assistant Melitta Mew and her husband Raymond. Popper's manuscripts went to the Hoover Institution at Stanford University, partly during his lifetime and partly as supplementary material after his death. The University of Klagenfurt acquired Popper's library in 1995. The Karl Popper Archives was established within the Klagenfurt University Library, holding Popper's library of approximately 6,000 books, including his precious bibliophilia, as well as hard copies of the original Hoover material and microfilms of the incremental material. The library as well as various other partial collections are open for researcher purposes. The remaining parts of the estate were mostly transferred to The Karl Popper Charitable Trust. In October 2008, the University of Klagenfurt acquired the copyrights from the estate.

== Honours and awards ==
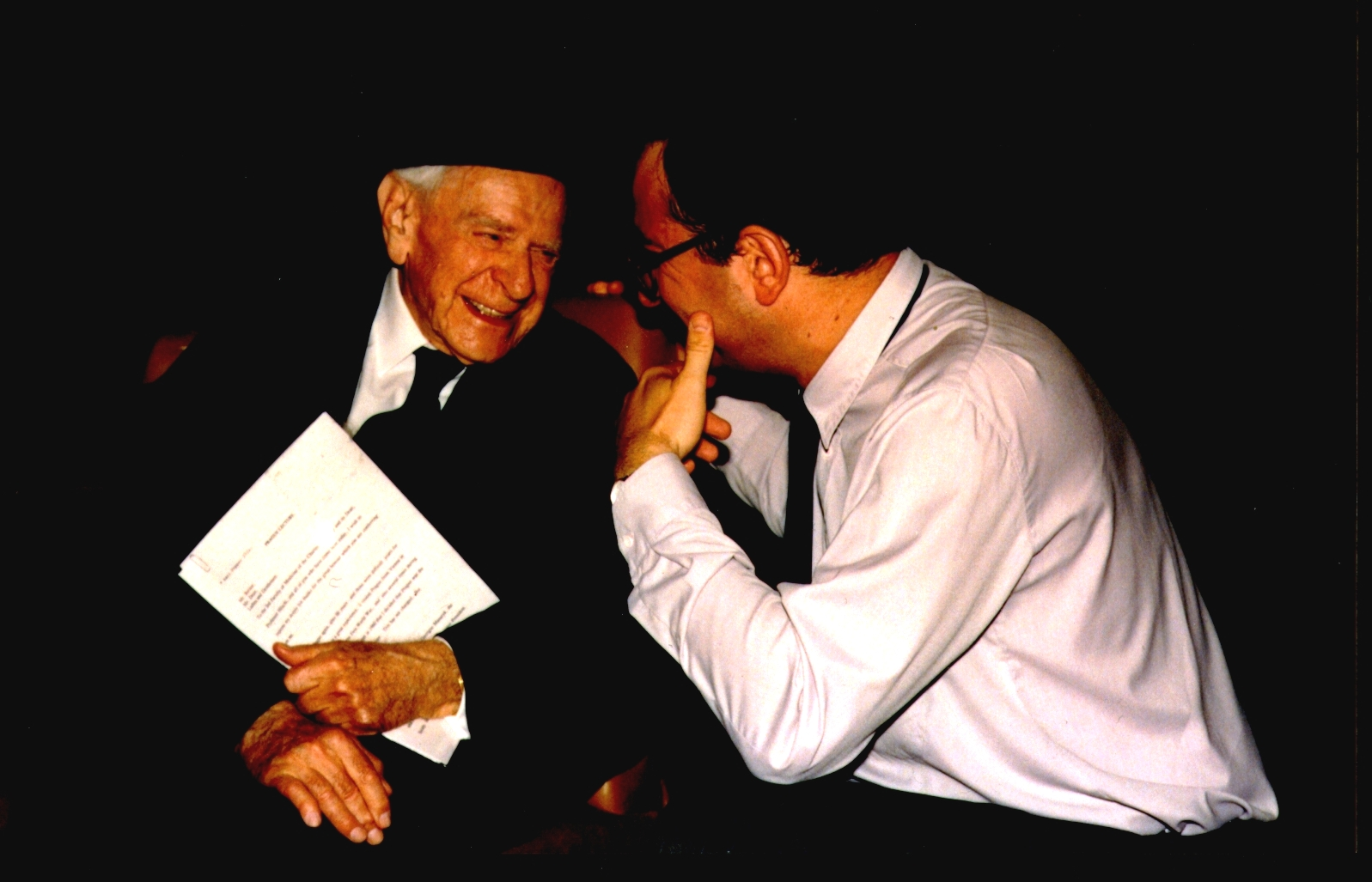
Popper with Professor Cyril Höschl, while receiving an honorary doctorate from Charles University in Prague in May 1994

Popper won many awards and honours in his field, including the Lippincott Award of the American Political Science Association, the Sonning Prize, the Otto Hahn Peace Medal of the United Nations Association of Germany in Berlin and fellowships in the Royal Society, British Academy, London School of Economics, King's College London, Darwin College, Cambridge, Austrian Academy of Sciences and Charles University, Prague. Austria awarded him the Grand Decoration of Honour in Gold for Services to the Republic of Austria in 1986, and the Federal Republic of Germany its Grand Cross with Star and Sash of the Order of Merit, and the peace class of the Order Pour le Mérite. He was knighted by Queen Elizabeth II in 1965, and was elected a Fellow of the Royal Society in 1976. He was invested with the insignia of a Member of the Order of the Companions of Honour in the 1982 Birthday Honours.

Other awards and recognition for Popper included the City of Vienna Prize for the Humanities (1965), Karl Renner Prize (1978), Austrian Decoration for Science and Art (1980), Dr. Leopold Lucas Prize of the University of Tübingen (1980), Ring of Honour of the City of Vienna (1983) and the Premio Internazionale of the Italian Federico Nietzsche Society (1988). In 1989, he was the first awarded the Prize International Catalonia for "his work to develop cultural, scientific and human values all around the world". In 1992, he was awarded the Kyoto Prize in Arts and Philosophy for "symbolising the open spirit of the 20th century" and for his "enormous influence on the formation of the modern intellectual climate".

== Philosophy ==
=== Background to Popper's ideas ===
Popper's rejection of Marxism during his teenage years left a profound mark on his thought. He had at one point joined a socialist association, and for a few months in 1919 considered himself a communist. Although it is known that Popper worked as an office boy at the communist headquarters, whether or not he ever became a member of the Communist Party is unclear. During this time he became familiar with the Marxist view of economics, class conflict, and history. Although he quickly became disillusioned with the views expounded by Marxists, his flirtation with the ideology led him to distance himself from those who believed that spilling blood for the sake of a revolution was necessary. He then took the view that when it came to sacrificing human lives, one was to think and act with extreme prudence.

The failure of democratic parties to prevent fascism from taking over Austrian politics in the 1920s and 1930s traumatised Popper. He suffered from the direct consequences of this failure since events after the Anschluss (the annexation of Austria by the German Reich in 1938) forced him into permanent exile. His most important works in the field of social science—The Poverty of Historicism (1944) and The Open Society and Its Enemies (1945)—were inspired by his reflection on the events of his time and represented, in a sense, a reaction to the prevalent totalitarian ideologies that then dominated Central European politics. His books defended democratic liberalism as a social and political philosophy. They also represented extensive critiques of the philosophical presuppositions underpinning all forms of totalitarianism.

Popper believed that there was a contrast between the theories of Sigmund Freud and Alfred Adler, which he considered non-scientific, and Albert Einstein's theory of relativity which set off the revolution in physics in the early 20th century. Popper thought that Einstein's theory, as a theory properly grounded in scientific thought and method, was highly "risky", in the sense that it was possible to deduce consequences from it which differed considerably from those of the then-dominant Newtonian physics; one such prediction, that gravity could deflect light, was verified by Eddington's experiments in 1919. In contrast he thought that nothing could, even in principle, falsify psychoanalytic theories. He thus came to the conclusion that they had more in common with primitive myths than with genuine science.

This led Popper to conclude that what was regarded as the remarkable strengths of psychoanalytical theories were actually their weaknesses. Psychoanalytical theories were crafted in a way that made them able to refute any criticism and to give an explanation for every possible form of human behaviour. The nature of such theories made it impossible for any criticism or experiment—even in principle—to show them to be false. When Popper tackled the problem of demarcation in the philosophy of science, this conclusion led him to posit that the strength of a scientific theory lies in its being susceptible to falsification. He considered that if a theory cannot, in principle, be falsified by criticism, it is not a scientific theory.

=== Philosophy of science ===
==== Falsifiability and the problem of demarcation ====
Popper coined the term "critical rationalism" to describe his philosophy. (Note: Popper 1962, Introduction, XV: "The proper answer to my question 'How can we hope to detect and eliminate error?' is, I believe, 'By criticizing the theories or guesses of others and – if we can train ourselves to do so—by criticizing our own theories or guesses.' (The latter point is highly desirable, but not indispensable; for if we fail to criticize our own theories, there may be others to do it for us.) This answer sums up a position which I propose to call 'critical rationalism'.") Popper rejected the empiricist view (following from Kant) that basic statements are infallible; rather, according to Popper, they are descriptions in relation to a theoretical framework. Concerning the method of science, the term "critical rationalism" indicates his rejection of classical empiricism, and the classical observationalist-inductivist account of science that had grown out of it. (Note: Akrami 2009, Sec. Popper's Critique of Vienna Circle and the Positivistic Approach: "Trying to analyze and solve the problem of demarcation, Popper came to the conclusion that classical empiricism and logical positivism, particularly as manifested in observationalist-inductivist account of science, must be criticized from a viewpoint that came to be called 'critical rationalism', a term that was used to describe his own philosophy.") Popper argued strongly against the latter, holding that scientific theories are abstract in nature and can be tested only indirectly, by reference to their implications. He also held that scientific theory, and human knowledge generally, is irreducibly conjectural or hypothetical, and is generated by the creative imagination to solve problems that have arisen in specific historico-cultural settings.

Logically, no number of positive outcomes at the level of experimental testing can confirm a scientific theory, but a single counterexample is logically decisive; it shows the theory, from which the implication is derived, to be false. Popper's account of the logical asymmetry between verification and falsifiability lies at the heart of his philosophy of science. It also inspired him to take falsifiability as his criterion of demarcation between metaphysics and science: a law should be considered scientific if, and only if, it makes predictions, irrespective of their validity or of our capacity to show them false. This led him to attack the claims of both psychoanalysis and contemporary Marxism to scientific status, on the basis that they do not make predictions, but instead are compatible with any possible observations.

In All Life is Problem Solving, Popper sought to explain the apparent progress of scientific knowledge—that is, how it is that our understanding of the universe seems to improve over time. This problem arises from his position that the truth content of our theories, even the best of them, cannot be verified by scientific testing, but can only be falsified. With only falsifications being possible logically, how can we explain the growth of knowledge? In Popper's view, the advance of scientific knowledge is an evolutionary process characterised by his formula:

$$\mathrm{PS}_1 \rightarrow \mathrm{TT}_1 \rightarrow \mathrm{EE}_1 \rightarrow \mathrm{PS}_2. \,$$

In response to a given problem situation ($\mathrm{PS}_1$), a number of competing conjectures, or tentative theories ($\mathrm{TT}$), are systematically subjected to the most rigorous attempts at falsification possible. This process, error elimination ($\mathrm{EE}$), performs a similar function for science that natural selection performs for biological evolution. Theories that better survive the process of refutation are not more true, but rather, more "fit"—in other words, more applicable to the problem situation at hand ($\mathrm{PS}_1$). Consequently, just as a species' biological fitness does not ensure continued survival, neither does rigorous testing protect a scientific theory from refutation in the future. Yet, as it appears that the engine of biological evolution has, over many generations, produced adaptive traits equipped to deal with more and more complex problems of survival, likewise, the evolution of theories through the scientific method may, in Popper's view, reflect a certain type of progress: toward more and more interesting problems ($\mathrm{PS}_2$). For Popper, it is in the interplay between the tentative theories (conjectures) and error elimination (refutation) that scientific knowledge advances toward greater and greater problems; in a process very much akin to the interplay between genetic variation and natural selection.

Popper also wrote extensively against the famous Copenhagen interpretation of quantum mechanics. He strongly disagreed with Niels Bohr's instrumentalism and supported Albert Einstein's scientific realist approach to scientific theories about the universe. He found that Bohr's interpretation introduced subjectivity into physics, claiming later in his life that:

Bohr was "a marvelous physicist, one of the greatest of all time, but he was a miserable philosopher, and one couldn't talk to him. He was talking all the time, allowing practically only one or two words to you and then at once cutting in."

This Popper's falsifiability resembles Charles Peirce's nineteenth-century fallibilism. In Of Clocks and Clouds (1966), Popper remarked that he wished he had known of Peirce's work earlier.

==== Falsification and the problem of induction ====
Among his contributions to philosophy is his claim to have solved the philosophical problem of induction. He states that while there is no way to prove that the sun will rise, it is possible to formulate the theory that every day the sun will rise; if it does not rise on some particular day, the theory will be falsified and will have to be replaced by a different one. Until such a falsifying instance occurs, there is, for Popper, no need to reject the tentative acceptance of the theory, even though it is never justified in an inductive sense. Nor is it rational according to Popper to make instead the more complex assumption that the sun will rise until a given day, but will stop doing so the day after, or similar statements with additional conditions. Such a theory would be true with higher probability because it cannot be attacked so easily:

- to falsify the first one, it is sufficient to find that the sun has stopped rising;
- to falsify the second one, one additionally needs the assumption that the given day has not yet been reached.

Popper held that it is the least likely, or most easily falsifiable, or simplest theory (attributes which he identified as all the same thing) that explains known facts that one should rationally prefer. His opposition to positivism, which held that it is the theory most likely to be true that one should prefer, here becomes very apparent. It is impossible, Popper argues, to ensure a theory to be true; it is more important that it is falsifiable.

Popper agreed with David Hume that there is often a psychological belief that the sun will rise tomorrow and that there is no logical justification for the supposition that it will, simply because it always has in the past. Popper writes,

I approached the problem of induction through Hume. Hume, I felt, was perfectly right in pointing out that induction cannot be logically justified.

=== Rationality ===
Popper held that rationality is not restricted to the realm of empirical or scientific theories, but that it is merely a special case of the general method of criticism, the method of finding and eliminating contradictions in knowledge without ad-hoc measures. According to this view, rational discussion about metaphysical ideas, about moral values and even about purposes is possible. Popper's student W.W. Bartley III tried to radicalise this idea and made the controversial claim that not only can criticism go beyond empirical knowledge but that everything can be rationally criticised.

To Popper, who was an anti-justificationist, traditional philosophy is misled by the false principle of sufficient reason. He thinks that no assumption can ever be or needs ever to be justified, so a lack of justification is not a justification for doubt. Instead, theories should be tested and scrutinised. It is not the goal to bless theories with claims of certainty or justification, but to eliminate errors in them. He writes,

[T]here are no such things as good positive reasons; nor do we need such things [...] But [philosophers] obviously cannot quite bring [themselves] to believe that this is my opinion, let alone that it is right. (The Philosophy of Karl Popper, p. 1043)

=== Philosophy of arithmetic ===
Popper's principle of falsifiability runs into prima facie difficulties when the epistemological status of mathematics is considered. It is difficult to conceive how simple statements of arithmetic, such as "2 + 2 = 4", could ever be shown to be false. If they are not open to falsification they can not be scientific. If they are not scientific, it needs to be explained how they can be informative about real world objects and events.

Popper's solution was an original contribution in the philosophy of mathematics. His idea was that a number statement such as "2 apples + 2 apples = 4 apples" can be taken in two senses. In its pure mathematics sense, "2 + 2 = 4" is logically true and cannot be refuted. Contrastingly, in its applied mathematics sense of it describing the physical behaviour of apples, it can be falsified. This can be done by placing two apples in a container, then proceeding to place another two apples in the same container. If there are five, three, or a number of apples that is not four in said container, the theory that "2 apples + 2 apples = 4 apples" is shown to be false. On the contrary, if there are four apples in the container, the theory of numbers is shown to be applicable to reality.

=== Political philosophy ===
In The Open Society and Its Enemies and The Poverty of Historicism, Popper developed a critique of historicism and a defence of the "Open Society". Popper considered historicism to be the theory that history develops inexorably and necessarily according to knowable general laws towards a determinate end. He argued that this view is the principal theoretical presupposition underpinning most forms of authoritarianism and totalitarianism. He argued that historicism is founded upon mistaken assumptions regarding the nature of scientific law and prediction. Since the growth of human knowledge is a causal factor in the evolution of human history, and since "no society can predict, scientifically, its own future states of knowledge", it follows, he argued, that there can be no predictive science of human history. For Popper, metaphysical and historical indeterminism go hand in hand.

In his early years Popper was impressed by Marxism, whether of Communists or socialists. An event that happened in 1919 had a profound effect on him: During a riot, caused by the Communists, the police shot several unarmed people, including some of Popper's friends, when they tried to free party comrades from prison. The riot had, in fact, been part of a plan by which leaders of the Communist party with connections to Béla Kun tried to take power by a coup; Popper did not know about this at that time. However, he knew that the riot instigators were swayed by the Marxist doctrine that class struggle would produce vastly more dead men than the inevitable revolution brought about as quickly as possible, and so had no scruples to put the life of the rioters at risk to achieve their selfish goal of becoming the future leaders of the working class. This was the start of his later criticism of historicism. Popper began to reject Marxist historicism, which he associated with questionable means, and later socialism, which he associated with placing equality before freedom (to the possible disadvantage of equality).

Popper said that he was a socialist for "several years", and maintained an interest in egalitarianism, but abandoned it as a whole because socialism was a "beautiful dream", but, just like egalitarianism, it was incompatible with individual liberty. Popper initially saw totalitarianism as exclusively right-wing in nature, although as early as 1945 in The Open Society he was describing Communist parties as giving a weak opposition to fascism due to shared historicism with fascism. Over time, primarily in defence of liberal democracy, Popper began to see Soviet-type communism as a form of totalitarianism, and viewed the main issue of the Cold War as not capitalism versus socialism, but democracy versus totalitarianism. In 1957, Popper would dedicate The Poverty of Historicism to "memory of the countless men, women and children of all creeds or nations or races who fell victims to the fascist and communist belief in Inexorable Laws of Historical Destiny."

In 1947, Popper co-founded the Mont Pelerin Society, with Friedrich Hayek, Milton Friedman, Ludwig von Mises and others, although he did not fully agree with the think tank's charter and ideology. Specifically, he unsuccessfully recommended that socialists should be invited to participate, and that emphasis should be put on a hierarchy of humanitarian values rather than advocacy of a free market as envisioned by classical liberalism.

==== The paradox of tolerance ====
Although Popper was an advocate of toleration, he also warned against unlimited tolerance. In The Open Society and Its Enemies, he argued:

Unlimited tolerance must lead to the disappearance of tolerance. If we extend unlimited tolerance even to those who are intolerant, if we are not prepared to defend a tolerant society against the onslaught of the intolerant, then the tolerant will be destroyed, and tolerance with them. In this formulation, I do not imply, for instance, that we should always suppress the utterance of intolerant philosophies; as long as we can counter them by rational argument and keep them in check by public opinion, suppression would certainly be most unwise. But we should claim the right to suppress them if necessary even by force; for it may easily turn out that they are not prepared to meet us on the level of rational argument, but begin by denouncing all argument; they may forbid their followers to listen to rational argument, because it is deceptive, and teach them to answer arguments by the use of their fists or pistols. We should therefore claim, in the name of tolerance, the right not to tolerate the intolerant. We should claim that any movement preaching intolerance places itself outside the law, and we should consider incitement to intolerance and persecution as criminal, in the same way as we should consider incitement to murder, or to kidnapping, or to the revival of the slave trade, as criminal.

==== The "conspiracy theory of society" ====
Popper criticized what he termed the "conspiracy theory of society", the view that powerful people or groups, godlike in their efficacy, are responsible for purposely bringing about all the ills of society. This view cannot be right, Popper argued, because "nothing ever comes off exactly as intended." According to philosopher David Coady, "Popper has often been cited by critics of conspiracy theories, and his views on the topic continue to constitute an orthodoxy in some circles." However, philosopher Charles Pigden has pointed out that Popper's argument only applies to a very extreme kind of conspiracy theory, not to conspiracy theories generally.

=== Metaphysics ===
==== Truth ====
As early as 1934, Popper wrote of the search for truth as "one of the strongest motives for scientific discovery." Still, he describes in Objective Knowledge (1972) early concerns about the much-criticised notion of truth as correspondence. Then came the semantic theory of truth formulated by the logician Alfred Tarski and published in 1933. Popper wrote of learning in 1935 of the consequences of Tarski's theory, to his intense joy. The theory met critical objections to truth as correspondence and thereby rehabilitated it. The theory also seemed, in Popper's eyes, to support metaphysical realism and the regulative idea of a search for truth.

According to this theory, the conditions for the truth of a sentence as well as the sentences themselves are part of a metalanguage. So, for example, the sentence "Snow is white" is true if and only if snow is white. Although many philosophers have interpreted, and continue to interpret, Tarski's theory as a deflationary theory, Popper refers to it as a theory in which "is true" is replaced with "corresponds to the facts". He bases this interpretation on the fact that examples such as the one described above refer to two things: assertions and the facts to which they refer. He identifies Tarski's formulation of the truth conditions of sentences as the introduction of a "metalinguistic predicate" and distinguishes the following cases:

1. "John called" is true.
2. "It is true that John called."

The first case belongs to the metalanguage whereas the second is more likely to belong to the object language. Hence, "it is true that" possesses the logical status of a redundancy. "Is true", on the other hand, is a predicate necessary for making general observations such as "John was telling the truth about Phillip."

Upon this basis, along with that of the logical content of assertions (where logical content is inversely proportional to probability), Popper went on to develop his important notion of verisimilitude or "truthlikeness". The intuitive idea behind verisimilitude is that the assertions or hypotheses of scientific theories can be objectively measured with respect to the amount of truth and falsity that they imply. And, in this way, one theory can be evaluated as more or less true than another on a quantitative basis which, Popper emphasises forcefully, has nothing to do with "subjective probabilities" or other merely "epistemic" considerations.

The simplest mathematical formulation that Popper gives of this concept can be found in the tenth chapter of Conjectures and Refutations. Here he defines it as:

$$\mathit{Vs}(a)=\mathit{CT}_v(a)-\mathit{CT}_f(a) \,$$

where $\mathit{Vs}(a)$ is the verisimilitude of a, $\mathit{CT}_v(a)$ is a measure of the content of the truth of a, and $\mathit{CT}_f(a)$ is a measure of the content of the falsity of a.

Popper's original attempt to define not just verisimilitude, but an actual measure of it, turned out to be inadequate. However, it inspired a wealth of new attempts.

==== Popper's three worlds ====
Knowledge, for Popper, was objective, both in the sense that it is objectively true (or truthlike), and also in the sense that knowledge has an ontological status (i.e., knowledge as object) independent of the knowing subject (Objective Knowledge: An Evolutionary Approach, 1972). He proposed three worlds: World One, being the physical world, or physical states; World Two, being the world of mind, or individuals' private mental states, ideas and perceptions; and World Three, being the public body of human knowledge expressed in its manifold forms (e.g., "scientific theories, ethical principles, characters in novels, philosophy, art, poetry, in short our entire cultural heritage"), or the products of World Two made manifest in the materials of World One (e.g., books, papers, paintings, symphonies, cathedrals, particle accelerators). World Three, Popper argued, was the product of individual human beings in exactly the same sense that an animal path in the jungle is the creation of many individual animals, but not planned or intended by any of them. World Three thus has an existence and an evolution independent of any individually known subjects. The influence of World Three on the individual human mind (World Two) is in Popper's view at least as strong as the influence of World One. In other words, the knowledge held by a given individual mind owes at least as much to the total, accumulated wealth of human knowledge made manifest as to the world of direct experience. As such, the growth of human knowledge could be said to be a function of the independent evolution of World Three.

Many contemporary philosophers, such as Daniel Dennett, have not embraced Popper's Three World conjecture, mainly owing to what they see as its resemblance to mind–body dualism. Popper himself, however, saw it rather as a form of pluralistic realism, with greater explanatory power than either physicalism or dualism.

==== Origin and evolution of life ====
The creation–evolution controversy raised the issue of whether creationistic ideas may be legitimately called science. In the debate, both sides and even courts in their decisions have invoked Popper's criterion of falsifiability (see Daubert standard). In this context, passages written by Popper are frequently quoted in which he speaks about such issues himself. For example, he famously stated "Darwinism is not a testable scientific theory, but a metaphysical research program—a possible framework for testable scientific theories." He continued:

And yet, the theory is invaluable. I do not see how, without it, our knowledge could have grown as it has done since Darwin. In trying to explain experiments with bacteria which become adapted to, say, penicillin, it is quite clear that we are greatly helped by the theory of natural selection. Although it is metaphysical, it sheds much light upon very concrete and very practical researches. It allows us to study adaptation to a new environment (such as a penicillin-infested environment) in a rational way: it suggests the existence of a mechanism of adaptation, and it allows us even to study in detail the mechanism at work.

He noted that theism, presented as explaining adaptation, "was worse than an open admission of failure, for it created the impression that an ultimate explanation had been reached". Popper later said:

When speaking here of Darwinism...This is an immensely impressive and powerful theory. The claim that it completely explains evolution is of course a bold claim, and very far from being established. All scientific theories are conjectures, even those that have successfully passed many severe and varied tests. The Mendelian underpinning of modern Darwinism has been well tested, and so has the theory of evolution....

He explained that the difficulty of testing had led some people to describe natural selection as a tautology, and that he too had in the past described the theory as "almost tautological", and had tried to explain how the theory could be untestable (as is a tautology) and yet of great scientific interest:

My solution was that the doctrine of natural selection is a most successful metaphysical research programme. It raises detailed problems in many fields, and it tells us what we would expect of an acceptable solution of these problems. I still believe that natural selection works in this way as a research programme. Nevertheless, I have changed my mind about the testability and logical status of the theory of natural selection; and I am glad to have an opportunity to make a recantation.

Popper summarised his new view as follows:

The theory of natural selection may be so formulated that it is far from tautological. In this case it is not only testable, but it turns out to be not strictly universally true. There seem to be exceptions, as with so many biological theories; and considering the random character of the variations on which natural selection operates, the occurrence of exceptions is not surprising. Thus not all phenomena of evolution are explained by natural selection alone. Yet in every particular case it is a challenging research program to show how far natural selection can possibly be held responsible for the evolution of a particular organ or behavioural program.

These frequently quoted passages are only a small part of what Popper wrote on evolution, however, and may give the wrong impression that he mainly discussed questions of its falsifiability. Popper never invented this criterion to give justifiable use of words like science. In fact, Popper stressed that "the last thing I wish to do, however, is to advocate another dogma" and that "what is to be called a 'science' and who is to be called a 'scientist' must always remain a matter of convention or decision." He quotes Menger's dictum that "Definitions are dogmas; only the conclusions drawn from them can afford us any new insight" and notes that different definitions of science can be rationally debated and compared:

I do not try to justify [the aims of science which I have in mind], however, by representing them as the true or the essential aims of science. This would only distort the issue, and it would mean a relapse into positivist dogmatism. There is only one way, as far as I can see, of arguing rationally in support of my proposals. This is to analyse their logical consequences: to point out their fertility—their power to elucidate the problems of the theory of knowledge.

Popper had his own sophisticated views on evolution that go much beyond what the frequently-quoted passages say. In effect, Popper agreed with some points of both creationists and naturalists, but disagreed with both on crucial aspects. Popper understood the universe as a creative entity that invents new things, including life, but without the necessity of something like a god, especially not one who is pulling strings from behind the curtain. He said that evolution of the genotype must, as the creationists say, work in a goal-directed way but disagreed with their view that it must necessarily be the hand of god that imposes these goals onto the stage of life.

Instead, he formulated the spearhead model of evolution, a version of genetic pluralism. According to this, living organisms have goals, and act according to these goals, each guided by a central control. In its most sophisticated form, this is the brain of humans, but controls also exist in much less sophisticated ways for species of lower complexity, such as the amoeba. This control organ plays a special role in evolution—it is the "spearhead of evolution". The goals bring the purpose into the world. Mutations in the genes that determine the structure of the control may then cause drastic changes in behaviour, preferences and goals, without having an impact on the organism's phenotype. Popper postulates that such purely behavioural changes are less likely to be lethal for the organism compared to drastic changes of the phenotype.

Popper contrasts his views with the notion of the "hopeful monster" that has large phenotype mutations and calls it the "hopeful behavioural monster". After behaviour has changed radically, small but quick changes of the phenotype follow to make the organism fitter to its changed goals. This way it looks as if the phenotype were changing guided by some invisible hand, while it is merely natural selection working in combination with the new behaviour. For example, according to this hypothesis, the eating habits of the giraffe must have changed before its elongated neck evolved. Popper contrasted this view as "evolution from within" or "active Darwinism" (the organism actively trying to discover new ways of life and being on a quest for conquering new ecological niches), with the naturalistic "evolution from without" (which has the picture of a hostile environment only trying to kill the mostly passive organism, or perhaps segregate some of its groups).

Popper was a key figure encouraging patent lawyer Günter Wächtershäuser to publish his iron–sulfur world hypothesis on abiogenesis and his criticism of "soup" theory.

On the creation-evolution controversy, Popper initially wrote that he considered it

a somewhat sensational clash between a brilliant scientific hypothesis concerning the history of the various species of animals and plants on earth, and an older metaphysical theory which, incidentally, happened to be part of an established religious belief

with a footnote to the effect that he

agree[s] with Professor C.E. Raven when...he calls this conflict 'a storm in a Victorian tea-cup'...

In his later work, however, when he had developed his own "spearhead model" and "active Darwinism" theories, Popper revised this view and found some validity in the controversy:

I have to confess that this cup of tea has become, after all, my cup of tea; and with it I have to eat humble pie.

==== Free will ====
Popper and John Eccles speculated on the problem of free will for many years, generally agreeing on an interactionist dualist theory of mind. However, although Popper was a body-mind dualist, he did not think that the mind is a substance separate from the body: he thought that mental or psychological properties or aspects of people are distinct from physical ones.

When he gave the second Arthur Holly Compton Memorial Lecture in 1965, Popper revisited the idea of quantum indeterminacy as a source of human freedom. Eccles had suggested that "critically poised neurons" might be influenced by the mind to assist in a decision. Popper criticised Compton's idea of amplified quantum events affecting the decision. He wrote:

The idea that the only alternative to determinism is just sheer chance was taken over by Schlick, together with many of his views on the subject, from Hume, who asserted that "the removal" of what he called "physical necessity" must always result in "the same thing with chance. As objects must either be conjoin'd or not,... 'tis impossible to admit of any medium betwixt chance and an absolute necessity".

I shall later argue against this important doctrine according to which the alternative to determinism is sheer chance. Yet I must admit that the doctrine seems to hold good for the quantum-theoretical models which have been designed to explain, or at least to illustrate, the possibility of human freedom. This seems to be the reason why these models are so very unsatisfactory.

Hume's and Schlick's ontological thesis that there cannot exist anything intermediate between chance and determinism seems to me not only highly dogmatic (not to say doctrinaire) but clearly absurd; and it is understandable only on the assumption that they believed in a complete determinism in which chance has no status except as a symptom of our ignorance.

Popper called not for something between chance and necessity but for a combination of randomness and control to explain freedom, though not yet explicitly in two stages with random chance before the controlled decision, saying, "freedom is not just chance but, rather, the result of a subtle interplay between something almost random or haphazard, and something like a restrictive or selective control."

Then in his 1977 book with John Eccles, The Self and its Brain, Popper finally formulates the two-stage model in a temporal sequence. And he compares free will to Darwinian evolution and natural selection:

New ideas have a striking similarity to genetic mutations. Now, let us look for a moment at genetic mutations. Mutations are, it seems, brought about by quantum theoretical indeterminacy (including radiation effects). Accordingly, they are also probabilistic and not in themselves originally selected or adequate, but on them there subsequently operates natural selection which eliminates inappropriate mutations. Now we could conceive of a similar process with respect to new ideas and to free-will decisions, and similar things.

That is to say, a range of possibilities is brought about by a probabilistic and quantum mechanically characterised set of proposals, as it were—of possibilities brought forward by the brain. On these there then operates a kind of selective procedure which eliminates those proposals and those possibilities which are not acceptable to the mind.

=== Religion and God ===
Popper was not a religious man in the formal sense of the word. He neither maintained any link with his Jewish ancestry nor was he an observant Lutheran. However, he did consider that every person including himself, was religious in the sense of believing in something more important and beyond us through which we can transcend ourselves. Popper called this something a Third World. In an interview that Popper gave in 1969 with the condition that it should be kept secret until after his death, he summarised his position on God as follows: "I don't know whether God exists or not (...) Some forms of atheism are arrogant and ignorant and should be rejected, but agnosticism—to admit that we don't know and to search—is all right. (...) When I look at what I call the gift of life, I feel a gratitude which is in tune with some religious ideas of God. However, the moment I even speak of it, I am embarrassed that I may do something wrong to God in talking about God." Aged fifteen, after reading Spinoza (at the suggestion of his father), Popper recounts that "it gave me a lifetime's dislike of theorizing about God".

In 1936, applying to the Academic Assistance Council to leave Austria, he described himself as "Protestant, namely evangelical but of Jewish origin." Responding to the question of whether he wanted religious communities approached on his behalf, opposite the Jewish Orthodox section he wrote "NO", underlining it twice.

Popper objected to organised religion, saying "it tends to use the name of God in vain", noting the danger of fanaticism because of religious conflicts: "The whole thing goes back to myths which, though they may have a kernel of truth, are untrue. Why then should the Jewish myth be true and the Indian and Egyptian myths not be true?"

Ethical issues always constituted an important part of the background to Popper's philosophy. He was a Patron and Honorary Advisor of the Humanist Society of New Zealand and affiliated with the British Humanist Association in the UK (later known as Humanists UK) as a member of the organisation Advisory Council; his concept of the open society provided the "ideological backbone" of humanist campaigning across the 1960s and 1970s. In this capacity, he also contributed an essay to the 1968 collection The Humanist Outlook. In later life he discussed ethics rarely, and religious questions hardly at all. While he maintained his affiliation with the British Humanist Association, he sympathized with the religious views of others where they were honestly held, and commented that he could not endorse "various humanist and secular offensives".

In a letter unrelated to the interview, he stressed his tolerant attitude: "Although I am not for religion, I do think that we should show respect for anybody who believes honestly." While he did not believe that religious convictions could be rationally justified, he recognised that religions were a source of comfort for their adherents: "because something isn't science, however, does not mean it is meaningless".

=== Criticism ===
Most criticisms of Popper's philosophy are of the falsification, or error elimination, element in his account of problem solving. Popper presents falsifiability as both an ideal and as an important principle in a practical method of effective human problem solving; as such, the current conclusions of science are stronger than pseudo-sciences or non-sciences, insofar as they have survived this particularly vigorous selection method.

He does not argue that any such conclusions are therefore true, or that this describes the actual methods of any particular scientist. Rather, it is recommended as an essential principle of methodology that, if enacted by a system or community, will lead to slow but steady progress of a sort (relative to how well the system or community enacts the method). It has been suggested that Popper's ideas are often mistaken for a hard logical account of truth because of the historical co-incidence of their appearing at the same time as logical positivism, the followers of which mistook his aims for their own.

The Quine–Duhem thesis argues that it is impossible to test a single hypothesis on its own, since each one comes as part of an environment of theories. Thus we can only say that the whole package of relevant theories has been collectively falsified, but cannot conclusively say which element of the package must be replaced. An example of this is given by the discovery of the planet Neptune: when the motion of Uranus was found not to match the predictions of Newton's laws, the theory "There are seven planets in the solar system" was rejected, and not Newton's laws themselves. Popper discussed this critique of naive falsificationism in Chapters 3 and 4 of The Logic of Scientific Discovery.

The philosopher Thomas Kuhn writes in The Structure of Scientific Revolutions (1962) that he places an emphasis on anomalous experiences similar to that which Popper places on falsification. However, he adds that anomalous experiences cannot be identified with falsification, and questions whether theories could be falsified in the manner suggested by Popper. Kuhn argues in The Essential Tension (1977) that while Popper was correct that psychoanalysis cannot be considered a science, there are better reasons for drawing that conclusion than those Popper provided. Popper's student Imre Lakatos attempted to reconcile Kuhn's work with falsificationism by arguing that science progresses by the falsification of research programs rather than the more specific universal statements of naive falsificationism.

Popper claimed to have recognised already in the 1934 version of his Logic of Discovery a fact later stressed by Kuhn, "that scientists necessarily develop their ideas within a definite theoretical framework", and to that extent to have anticipated Kuhn's central point about "normal science". However, Popper criticised what he saw as Kuhn's relativism, this criticism being at the heart of the Kuhn–Popper debate. Also, in his collection Conjectures and Refutations: The Growth of Scientific Knowledge (Harper & Row, 1963), Popper writes,

Science must begin with myths, and with the criticism of myths; neither with the collection of observations, nor with the invention of experiments, but with the critical discussion of myths, and of magical techniques and practices. The scientific tradition is distinguished from the pre-scientific tradition in having two layers. Like the latter, it passes on its theories; but it also passes on a critical attitude towards them. The theories are passed on, not as dogmas, but rather with the challenge to discuss them and improve upon them.

Another objection is that it is not always possible to demonstrate falsehood definitively, especially if one is using statistical criteria to evaluate a null hypothesis. More generally, it is not always clear, if evidence contradicts a hypothesis, that this is a sign of flaws in the hypothesis rather than of flaws in the evidence. However, this is a misunderstanding of what Popper's philosophy of science sets out to do. Rather than offering a set of instructions that merely need to be followed diligently to achieve science, Popper makes it clear in The Logic of Scientific Discovery that his belief is that the resolution of conflicts between hypotheses and observations can only be a matter of the collective judgment of scientists, in each individual case.

In Science Versus Crime, Houck writes that Popper's falsificationism can be questioned logically: it is not clear how Popper would deal with a statement like "for every metal, there is a temperature at which it will melt". The hypothesis cannot be falsified by any possible observation, for there will always be a higher temperature than tested at which the metal may in fact melt, yet it seems to be a valid scientific hypothesis. These examples were pointed out by Carl Gustav Hempel. Hempel came to acknowledge that logical positivism's verificationism was untenable, but argued that falsificationism was equally untenable on logical grounds alone. The simplest response to this is that, because Popper describes how theories attain, maintain and lose scientific status, individual consequences of currently accepted scientific theories are scientific in the sense of being part of tentative scientific knowledge, and both of Hempel's examples fall under this category. For instance, atomic theory implies that all metals melt at some temperature.

An early adversary of Popper's critical rationalism, Karl-Otto Apel attempted a comprehensive refutation of Popper's philosophy. In Transformation der Philosophie (1973), Apel charged Popper with being guilty of, amongst other things, a pragmatic contradiction.

The philosopher Adolf Grünbaum argues in The Foundations of Psychoanalysis (1984) that Popper's view that psychoanalytic theories, even in principle, cannot be falsified is incorrect. The philosopher Roger Scruton argues in Sexual Desire (1986) that Popper was mistaken to claim that Freudian theory implies no testable observation and therefore does not have genuine predictive power. Scruton maintains that Freudian theory has both "theoretical terms" and "empirical content". He points to the example of Freud's theory of repression, which in his view has "strong empirical content" and implies testable consequences. Nevertheless, Scruton also concluded that Freudian theory is not genuinely scientific. The philosopher Charles Taylor accuses Popper of exploiting his worldwide fame as an epistemologist to diminish the importance of philosophers of the 20th-century continental tradition. According to Taylor, Popper's criticisms are completely baseless, but they are received with an attention and respect that Popper's "intrinsic worth hardly merits".

The philosopher John Gray argues that Popper's account of scientific method would have prevented the theories of Charles Darwin and Albert Einstein from being accepted. However, Gray's criticism with regards to Einstein is at odds with the fact that Popper frequently used Einstein's theory of general relativity as a case study of how the principle of falsifiability works in practice.

Popper, the historian of ideas and his scholarship, is criticised in some academic quarters for his treatment of Plato and Hegel.

The philosopher and psychologist Michel ter Hark wrote in Popper, Otto Selz and the Rise of Evolutionary Epistemology (2004) that Popper took some of his ideas from his tutor, the German psychologist Otto Selz. Selz never published his ideas, partly because of the rise of Nazism, which forced him to quit his work in 1933 and prohibited any reference to his ideas.

== Influence ==
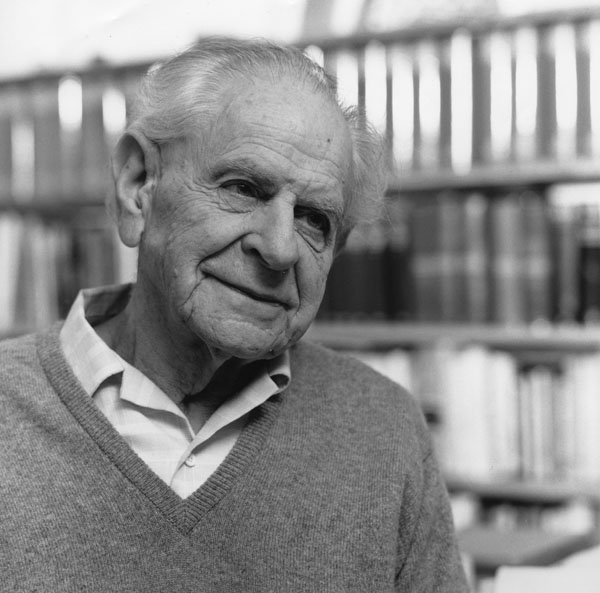
Popper in 1990

Popper helped to establish the philosophy of science as an autonomous discipline within philosophy, both through his own prolific and influential works and through his influence on his contemporaries and students. In 1946, Popper founded the Department of Philosophy, Logic and Scientific Method at the London School of Economics (LSE) and there lectured and influenced both Imre Lakatos and Paul Feyerabend, two of the foremost philosophers of science in the next generation. (Lakatos significantly modified Popper's position, and Feyerabend repudiated it entirely, but the work of both was deeply influenced by Popper and engaged with many of the problems that Popper set.)

Although there is some dispute as to the matter of influence, Popper had a longstanding and close friendship with economist Friedrich Hayek, who was also brought to LSE from Vienna. Each found support and similarities in the other's work, citing each other often, though not without qualification. In a letter to Hayek in 1944, Popper stated, "I think I have learnt more from you than from any other living thinker, except perhaps Alfred Tarski." Popper dedicated his Conjectures and Refutations to Hayek. For his part, Hayek dedicated a collection of papers, Studies in Philosophy, Politics, and Economics, to Popper, and in 1982 said, "ever since his Logik der Forschung first came out in 1934, I have been a complete adherent to his general theory of methodology."

Popper also had long and mutually influential friendships with art historian Ernst Gombrich, biologist Peter Medawar, and neuroscientist John Carew Eccles. The German jurist Reinhold Zippelius uses Popper's method of "trial and error" in his legal philosophy. Peter Medawar called him "incomparably the greatest philosopher of science that has ever been".

Popper's influence, both through his work in philosophy of science and through his political philosophy, has also extended beyond the academy. One of Popper's students at LSE was George Soros, who later became a billionaire investor and among whose philanthropic foundations is the Open Society Institute, a think-tank named in honour of Popper's The Open Society and Its Enemies. Soros revised his own philosophy, differing from some of Popper's epistemological assumptions, in a lecture entitled Open Society given at Central European University on 28 October 2009:

Popper was mainly concerned with the problems of understanding of reality [...] He argued that and I quote "only democracy provides an institutional framework that permits reform without violence, and so the use of reason in politics matters." But his approach was based on a hidden assumption, namely, that the main purpose of thinking is to gain a better understanding of reality. And that was not necessarily the case. The manipulative function could take precedence over the cognitive function [...] How could Popper take it for granted that free political discourse is aimed at understanding reality? And even more intriguingly, how could I, who gave the manipulative function pride of place in the concept of reflexivity, follow him so blindly? [...] Let me spell out my conclusion more clearly, an open society is a desirable form of social organization, both as a means to an end, and an end in itself [...] provided it gives precedence to the cognitive over the manipulative function and people are willing to confront harsh realities. [...] The value of individual freedom is likely to assume increasing importance in the immediate future.

== Published works ==
A complete list of Popper's writings is available as part 1.1 of the International personal bibliography of Karl R. Popper on the website of Karl Popper Archives at the University of Klagenfurt (see also External links).

- The Two Fundamental Problems of the Theory of Knowledge, 1930–1933 (as a typescript circulating as Die beiden Grundprobleme der Erkenntnistheorie; as a German book 1979, as English translation 2008), ISBN 0415394317
- The Logic of Scientific Discovery, 1934 (as Logik der Forschung, English translation 1959), ISBN 0415278449
- The Poverty of Historicism, 1936 (private reading at a meeting in Brussels, 1944–45 as a series of journal articles in Econometrica, 1957 a book), ISBN 0415065690
- The Open Society and Its Enemies, 1945 Vol 1 ISBN 0415290635, Vol 2 ISBN 0415290635
- Quantum Theory and the Schism in Physics, 1956–57 (as privately circulated galley proofs; published as a book 1982), ISBN 0415091128
- The Open Universe: An Argument for Indeterminism, 1956–57 (as privately circulated galley proofs; published as a book 1982), ISBN 0415078652
- Realism and the Aim of Science, 1956–57 (as privately circulated galley proofs; published as a book 1983), ISBN 0091514509
- Conjectures and Refutations: The Growth of Scientific Knowledge, 1963, ISBN 0415043182
- Of Clouds and Clocks: An Approach to the Problem of Rationality and the Freedom of Man, 1965
- Objective Knowledge: An Evolutionary Approach, 1972, Rev. ed., 1979, ISBN 0198750242
- Unended Quest: An Intellectual Autobiography, 2002 [1976]. ISBN 0415285895, 0415285909)
- The Self and Its Brain: An Argument for Interactionism (with Sir John C. Eccles), 1977, ISBN 0415058988
- In Search of a Better World, 1984, ISBN 0415135486
- Die Zukunft ist offen (The Future is Open) (with Konrad Lorenz), 1985 (in German), ISBN 349200640X
- A World of Propensities, 1990, ISBN 1855060000
- The Lesson of this Century, (Interviewer: Giancarlo Bosetti, English translation: Patrick Camiller), 1992, ISBN 0415129583
- All Life is Problem Solving, 1994, ISBN 0415249929
- The Myth of the Framework: In Defence of Science and Rationality (edited by Mark Amadeus Notturno) 1994. ISBN 0415135559
- Knowledge and the Mind-Body Problem: In Defence of Interaction (edited by Mark Amadeus Notturno) 1994 ISBN 0415115043
- The World of Parmenides, Essays on the Presocratic Enlightenment, 1998, Edited by Arne F. Petersen with the assistance of Jørgen Mejer, ISBN 0415173019
- After The Open Society, 2008. (Edited by Jeremy Shearmur and Piers Norris Turner, this volume contains a large number of Popper's previously unpublished or uncollected writings on political and social themes.) ISBN 978-0415309080
- Frühe Schriften, 2006 (Edited by Troels Eggers Hansen, includes Popper's writings and publications from before the Logic, including his previously unpublished thesis, dissertation and journal articles published that relate to the Wiener Schulreform.) ISBN 978-3161476327

== Filmography ==
- Interview Karl Popper, Open Universiteit, 1988.

== See also ==
- Calculus of predispositions
- Contributions to liberal theory
- Evolutionary epistemology
- Liberalism in Austria
- List of refugees
- Popper's experiment
- Positivism dispute
- Predispositioning theory
- Karl Popper – Wikiquote
- George Soros
