= Unended Quest =

Autobiography of Karl Popper

Unended Quest: An Intellectual Autobiography
- Cover of the first edition
- Author: Karl Popper
- Language: English
- Subject: Autobiography
- Published: 1976
- Publication place: United States
- Media type: Print (Hardcover and Paperback)
- Pages: iii, 316 pp. [2002 ed.]
- ISBN: 0-87548-366-6
- OCLC: 15053466
- Dewey Decimal: 192 B
- LC Class: B1649.P64 A38

Unended Quest: An Intellectual Autobiography is a 1976 book by the philosopher Karl Popper.

The work first appeared with the title "Autobiography of Karl Popper" in The Philosophy of Karl Popper (1974) from the Library of Living Philosophers series.

The book chronicles Popper's life from the beginning, including wider implications he drew from his experiences. In chapter 1, "Omniscience and Fallibility," for example, he describes his apprenticeship to a cabinetmaker while he was a university student. His master invited him to ask anything he liked, because, with due modesty, the master claimed to know everything. Popper writes that he became a disciple of Socrates and learned more about the theory of knowledge, including how little he knew, from his 'omniscient master' than from his university teachers. Other thematic chapter subjects include music, education, philosophical problems Popper encountered, and his differences from other philosophers, whether earlier or contemporary. These are woven into an account of events in his life and research programmes that he developed. For example, Chapter 24 discusses 2 of his best-known works, The Open Society and Its Enemies and The Poverty of Historicism, and the origins of 'critical rationalism' to describe the approach he espoused.
