= The Myth of the Framework =

1994 book by Karl Popper

The Myth of the Framework: In Defence of Science and Rationality
- Cover of the first edition, showing Karl Popper in 1988
- Author: Karl Popper
- Language: English
- Subject: Philosophy of science
- Publisher: Routledge
- Publication date: 1994
- Media type: Print (Hardcover and Paperback)
- Pages: 230
- ISBN: 978-0415113205

The Myth of the Framework: In Defence of Science and Rationality is a 1994 book by the philosopher Karl Popper.

The book is a collection of papers "prepared on different occasions as lectures for non-specialist audiences" (p. x).

The author formulates a premise for the book as: I may be wrong and you may be right, and by an effort, we may get nearer to the truth (p. xii).

== See also ==
- Critical rationalism
- Myth of the Given
