= Einstein–Podolsky–Rosen paradox =

Historical critique of quantum mechanics

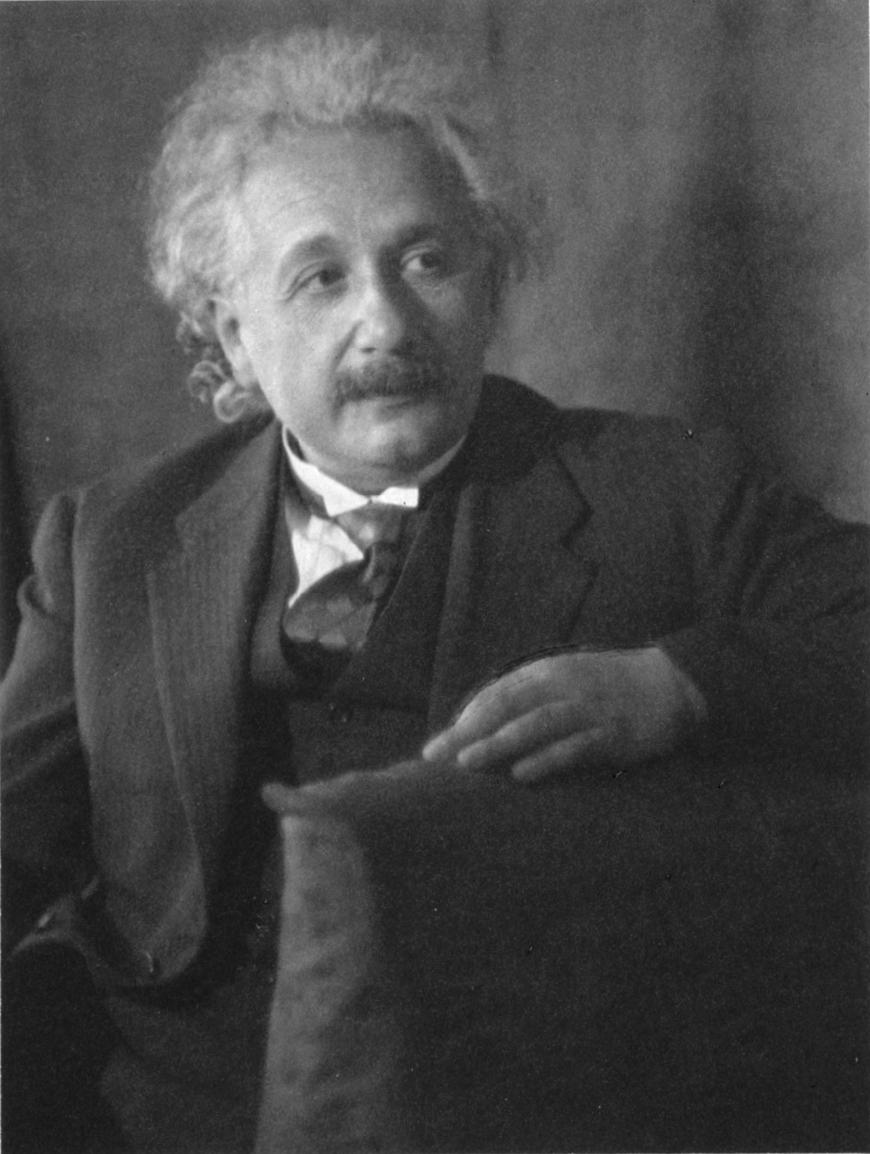
Albert Einstein

The Einstein–Podolsky–Rosen (EPR) paradox is a thought experiment proposed by physicists Albert Einstein, Boris Podolsky and Nathan Rosen, which argues that the description of physical reality provided by quantum mechanics is incomplete. In a 1935 paper titled "Can Quantum-Mechanical Description of Physical Reality be Considered Complete?", they argued for the existence of "elements of reality" that were not part of quantum theory, and speculated that it should be possible to construct a theory containing these hidden variables. Resolutions of the paradox have important implications for the interpretation of quantum mechanics.

The thought experiment involves a pair of particles prepared in what would later become known as an entangled state. Einstein, Podolsky, and Rosen pointed out that, in this state, if the position of the first particle were measured, the result of measuring the position of the second particle could be predicted. If instead the momentum of the first particle were measured, then the result of measuring the momentum of the second particle could be predicted. They argued that no action taken on the first particle could instantaneously affect the other, since this would involve information being transmitted faster than light, which is impossible according to the theory of relativity. They invoked a principle, later known as the "EPR criterion of reality", which posited that: "If, without in any way disturbing a system, we can predict with certainty (i.e., with probability equal to unity) the value of a physical quantity, then there exists an element of reality corresponding to that quantity." From this, they inferred that the second particle must have a definite value of both position and of momentum prior to either quantity being measured. But quantum mechanics considers these two observables incompatible and thus does not associate simultaneous values for both to any system. Einstein, Podolsky, and Rosen therefore concluded that quantum theory does not provide a complete description of reality.

== The "Paradox" paper ==
The term "Einstein–Podolsky–Rosen paradox" or "EPR" arose from a paper written in 1934 after Einstein joined the Institute for Advanced Study, having fled the rise of Nazi Germany. The original paper purports to describe what must happen to "two systems I and II, which we permit to interact", and after some time "we suppose that there is no longer any interaction between the two parts." The EPR description involves "two particles, A and B, [which] interact briefly and then move off in opposite directions." According to Heisenberg's uncertainty principle, it is impossible to measure both the momentum and the position of particle B exactly; however, it is possible to measure the exact position of particle A. By calculation, therefore, with the exact position of particle A known, the exact position of particle B can be known. Alternatively, the exact momentum of particle A can be measured, so the exact momentum of particle B can be worked out. As Manjit Kumar writes, "EPR argued that they had proved that ... [particle] B can have simultaneously exact values of position and momentum. ... Particle B has a position that is real and a momentum that is real. EPR appeared to have contrived a means to establish the exact values of either the momentum or the position of B due to measurements made on particle A, without the slightest possibility of particle B being physically disturbed."

EPR tried to set up a paradox, "a seemingly absurd or self contradictory statement or proposition that may in fact be true", to question the range of true application of quantum mechanics: quantum theory predicts that both values cannot be known for a particle, and yet the EPR thought experiment purports to show that they must both have determinate values. The EPR paper says: "We are thus forced to conclude that the quantum-mechanical description of physical reality given by wave functions is not complete." The EPR paper ends by saying: "While we have thus shown that the wave function does not provide a complete description of the physical reality, we left open the question of whether or not such a description exists. We believe, however, that such a theory is possible." The 1935 EPR paper condensed the philosophical discussion into a physical argument. The authors claim that given a specific experiment, in which the outcome of a measurement is known before the measurement takes place, there must exist something in the real world, an "element of reality", that determines the measurement outcome. They postulate that these elements of reality are, in modern terminology, local, in the sense that each belongs to a certain point in spacetime. Each element may, again in modern terminology, only be influenced by events that are located in the backward light cone of its point in spacetime (i.e. in the past). These claims are thus founded on assumptions about nature that constitute what is now known as local realism.

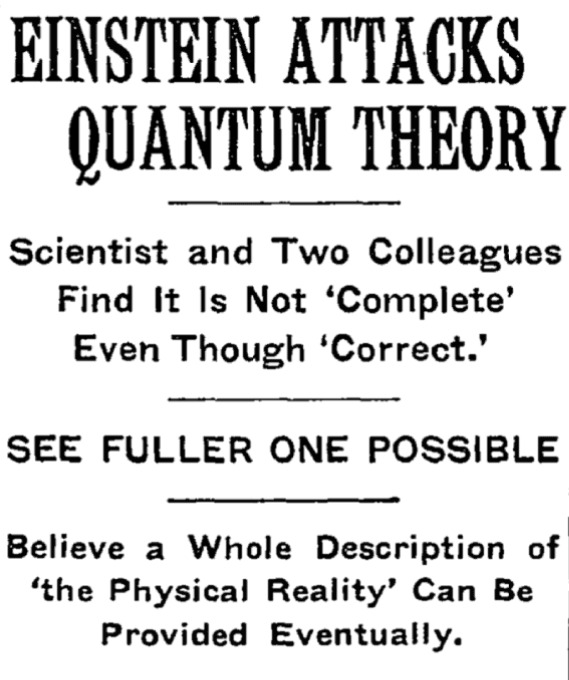
Article headline regarding the EPR paradox paper in the May 4, 1935, issue of The New York Times

Though the EPR paper has often been taken as an exact expression of Einstein's views, it was primarily authored by Podolsky, based on discussions at the Institute for Advanced Study with Einstein and Rosen. Einstein later expressed to Erwin Schrödinger that, "it did not come out as well as I had originally wanted; rather, the essential thing was, so to speak, smothered by the formalism." Einstein would later go on to present an individual account of his local realist ideas. Shortly before the EPR paper appeared in the Physical Review, The New York Times ran a news story about it, under the headline "Einstein Attacks Quantum Theory". The story, which quoted Podolsky, irritated Einstein, who wrote to the Times, "Any information upon which the article 'Einstein Attacks Quantum Theory' in your issue of May 4 is based was given to you without authority. It is my invariable practice to discuss scientific matters only in the appropriate forum and I deprecate advance publication of any announcement in regard to such matters in the secular press."

The Times story also sought out comment from physicist Edward Condon, who said, "Of course, a great deal of the argument hinges on just what meaning is to be attached to the word 'reality' in physics." The physicist and historian Max Jammer later noted, "[I]t remains a historical fact that the earliest criticism of the EPR paper – moreover, a criticism that correctly saw in Einstein's conception of physical reality the key problem of the whole issue – appeared in a daily newspaper prior to the publication of the criticized paper itself." The term "paradox" was associated with the paper already in 1935 by Schrodinger and notably again later by David Bohm, Yakir Aharonov and John Stewart Bell.

=== Bohr's reply ===
The publication of the paper prompted a response by Niels Bohr, which he published in the same journal (Physical Review), in the same year, using the same title. (This exchange was only one chapter in a prolonged debate between Bohr and Einstein about the nature of quantum reality.) He argued that EPR had reasoned fallaciously. Bohr said measurements of position and of momentum are complementary, meaning the choice to measure one excludes the possibility of measuring the other. Consequently, a fact deduced regarding one arrangement of laboratory apparatus could not be combined with a fact deduced by means of the other, and so, the inference of predetermined position and momentum values for the second particle was not valid. Bohr concluded that EPR's "arguments do not justify their conclusion that the quantum description turns out to be essentially incomplete".

=== Einstein's own argument ===
In his own publications and correspondence, Einstein indicated that he was not satisfied with the EPR paper and that Podolsky had authored most of it. He later used a different argument to insist that quantum mechanics is an incomplete theory. He explicitly de-emphasized EPR's attribution of "elements of reality" to the position and momentum of particle B, saying that "I couldn't care less" whether the resulting states of particle B allowed one to predict the position and momentum with certainty. (Note: "Ob die $\psi_B$ und $\psi_\underline{B}$ als Eigenfunktionen von Observabeln $B,\underline{B}$ aufgefasst werden können ist mir wurst." Emphasis from the original. "Ist mir wurst" is a German expression that literally translates to "It is a sausage to me", but means "I couldn't care less". Letter from Einstein to Schrödinger, dated 19th June 1935.)

For Einstein, the crucial part of the argument was the demonstration of nonlocality, that the choice of measurement done in particle A, either position or momentum, would lead to two different quantum states of particle B. He argued that, because of locality, the real state of particle B could not depend on which kind of measurement was done in A and that the quantum states therefore cannot be in one-to-one correspondence with the real states. Einstein struggled unsuccessfully for the rest of his life to find a theory that could better comply with his idea of locality.

== Later developments ==
=== Bohm's variant ===
In 1951, David Bohm proposed a variant of the EPR thought experiment in which the measurements have discrete ranges of possible outcomes, unlike the position and momentum measurements considered by EPR. The EPR–Bohm thought experiment can be explained using electron–positron pairs. Suppose we have a source that emits electron–positron pairs, with the electron sent to destination A, where there is an observer named Alice, and the positron sent to destination B, where there is an observer named Bob. According to quantum mechanics, we can arrange our source so that each emitted pair occupies a quantum state called a spin singlet. The particles are thus said to be entangled. This can be viewed as a quantum superposition of two states, which we call state I and state II. In state I, the electron has spin pointing upward along the z-axis (+z) and the positron has spin pointing downward along the z-axis (−z). In state II, the electron has spin −z and the positron has spin +z. Because it is in a superposition of states, it is impossible without measuring to know the definite state of spin of either particle in the spin singlet.

The EPR thought experiment, performed with electron–positron pairs. A source (center) sends particles toward two observers, electrons to Alice (left) and positrons to Bob (right), who can perform spin measurements.

Alice now measures the spin along the z-axis. She can obtain one of two possible outcomes: +z or −z. Suppose she gets +z. Informally speaking, the quantum state of the system collapses into state I. The quantum state determines the probable outcomes of any measurement performed on the system. In this case, if Bob subsequently measures spin along the z-axis, there is 100% probability that he will obtain −z. Similarly, if Alice gets −z, Bob will get +z. There is nothing special about choosing the z-axis: according to quantum mechanics the spin singlet state may equally well be expressed as a superposition of spin states pointing in the x direction.

Whatever axis their spins are measured along, they are always found to be opposite. In quantum mechanics, the x-spin and z-spin are "incompatible observables", meaning the Heisenberg uncertainty principle applies to alternating measurements of them: a quantum state cannot possess a definite value for both of these variables. Suppose Alice measures the z-spin and obtains +z, so that the quantum state collapses into state I. Now, instead of measuring the z-spin as well, Bob measures the x-spin. According to quantum mechanics, when the system is in state I, Bob's x-spin measurement will have a 50% probability of producing +x and a 50% probability of -x. It is impossible to predict which outcome will appear until Bob actually performs the measurement. Therefore, Bob's positron will have a definite spin when measured along the same axis as Alice's electron, but when measured in the perpendicular axis its spin will be uniformly random. It seems as if information has propagated (faster than light) from Alice's apparatus to make Bob's positron assume a definite spin in the appropriate axis.

=== Bell's theorem ===
In 1964, John Stewart Bell published a paper investigating the puzzling situation at that time: on one hand, the EPR paradox purportedly showed that quantum mechanics was nonlocal, and suggested that a hidden-variable theory could heal this nonlocality. On the other hand, David Bohm had recently developed the first successful hidden-variable theory, but it had a grossly nonlocal character. Bell set out to investigate whether it was indeed possible to solve the nonlocality problem with hidden variables, and found out that first, the correlations shown in both EPR's and Bohm's versions of the paradox could indeed be explained in a local way with hidden variables, and second, that the correlations shown in his own variant of the paradox couldn't be explained by any local hidden-variable theory. This second result became known as the Bell theorem.

To understand the first result, consider the following toy hidden-variable theory introduced later by J.J. Sakurai: in it, quantum spin-singlet states emitted by the source are actually approximate descriptions for "true" physical states possessing definite values for the z-spin and x-spin. In these "true" states, the positron going to Bob always has spin values opposite to the electron going to Alice, but the values are otherwise completely random. For example, the first pair emitted by the source might be "(+z, −x) to Alice and (−z, +x) to Bob", the next pair "(−z, −x) to Alice and (+z, +x) to Bob", and so forth. Therefore, if Bob's measurement axis is aligned with Alice's, he will necessarily get the opposite of whatever Alice gets; if it is perpendicular, he will get "+" and "−" with equal probability.

Bell showed, however, that such models can only reproduce the singlet correlations when Alice and Bob make measurements on the same axis or on perpendicular axes. As soon as other angles between their axes are allowed, local hidden-variable theories become unable to reproduce the quantum mechanical correlations. This difference, expressed using inequalities known as "Bell inequalities", is in principle experimentally testable. After the publication of Bell's paper, a variety of experiments to test Bell inequalities were carried out, notably by the group of Alain Aspect in the 1980s; all experiments conducted to date have found behavior in line with the predictions of quantum mechanics. The present view of the situation is that quantum mechanics flatly contradicts Einstein's philosophical postulate that any acceptable physical theory must fulfill "local realism". The fact that quantum mechanics violates Bell inequalities indicates that any hidden-variable theory underlying quantum mechanics must be non-local; whether this should be taken to imply that quantum mechanics itself is non-local is a matter of continuing debate.

== Steering ==
Inspired by Schrödinger's treatment of the EPR paradox back in 1935, Howard M. Wiseman et al. formalised it in 2007 as the phenomenon of quantum steering. They defined steering as the situation where Alice's measurements on a part of an entangled state steer Bob's part of the state. That is, Bob's observations cannot be explained by a local hidden state model, where Bob would have a fixed quantum state in his side, which is classically correlated but otherwise independent of Alice's.

== Locality ==
Locality has several different meanings in physics. EPR describe the principle of locality as asserting that physical processes occurring at one place should have no immediate effect on the elements of reality at another location. At first sight, this appears to be a reasonable assumption to make, as it seems to be a consequence of special relativity, which states that energy can never be transmitted faster than the speed of light without violating causality; however, it turns out that the usual rules for combining quantum mechanical and classical descriptions violate EPR's principle of locality without violating special relativity or causality. Causality is preserved because there is no way for Alice to transmit messages (i.e., information) to Bob by manipulating her measurement axis. Whichever axis she uses, she has a 50% probability of obtaining "+" and 50% probability of obtaining "−", completely at random; according to quantum mechanics, it is fundamentally impossible for her to influence what result she gets. Furthermore, Bob is able to perform his measurement only once: there is a fundamental property of quantum mechanics, the no-cloning theorem, which makes it impossible for him to make an arbitrary number of copies of the electron he receives, perform a spin measurement on each, and look at the statistical distribution of the results. Therefore, in the one measurement he is allowed to make, there is a 50% probability of getting "+" and 50% of getting "−", regardless of whether or not his axis is aligned with Alice's.

As a summary, the results of the EPR thought experiment do not contradict the predictions of special relativity. Neither the EPR paradox nor any quantum experiment demonstrates that superluminal signaling is possible; however, the principle of locality appeals powerfully to physical intuition, and Einstein, Podolsky and Rosen were unwilling to abandon it. Einstein derided the quantum mechanical predictions as "spooky action at a distance". (Note: "Spukhaften Fernwirkung", in the German original. Used in a letter to Max Born dated March 3, 1947.) The conclusion they drew was that quantum mechanics is not a complete theory.

== Mathematical formulation ==
Bohm's variant of the EPR paradox can be expressed mathematically using the quantum mechanical formulation of spin. Each spin degree of freedom for an electron is associated with a two-dimensional complex vector space V, with each quantum state corresponding to a vector in that space. The operators corresponding to the spin along the x, y, and z direction, denoted S_{x}, S_{y}, and S_{z} respectively, can be represented using the Pauli matrices:
$$S_x = \frac{\hbar}{2} \begin{bmatrix} 0 &  1 \\ 1 &  0 \end{bmatrix}, \quad
S_y = \frac{\hbar}{2} \begin{bmatrix} 0 & -i \\ i &  0 \end{bmatrix}, \quad
S_z = \frac{\hbar}{2} \begin{bmatrix} 1 &  0 \\ 0 & -1 \end{bmatrix},$$
where $\hbar$ is the reduced Planck constant (or the Planck constant divided by 2π).

The eigenstates of S_{z} are represented as
$$\left|+z\right\rangle \leftrightarrow \begin{bmatrix}1\\0\end{bmatrix}, \quad
\left|-z\right\rangle \leftrightarrow \begin{bmatrix}0\\1\end{bmatrix}$$
and the eigenstates of S_{x} are represented as
$$\left|+x\right\rangle \leftrightarrow \frac{1}{\sqrt{2}} \begin{bmatrix}1\\1\end{bmatrix}, \quad
\left|-x\right\rangle \leftrightarrow \frac{1}{\sqrt{2}} \begin{bmatrix}1\\-1\end{bmatrix}.$$

The vector space of the electron-positron pair is $V \otimes V$, the tensor product of the electron's and positron's vector spaces. The spin singlet state is
$$\left|\psi\right\rangle = \frac{1}{\sqrt{2}} \biggl(
\left|+z\right\rangle \otimes \left|-z\right\rangle -
\left|-z\right\rangle \otimes \left|+z\right\rang
\biggr),$$
where the two terms on the right hand side are what we have referred to as state I and state II above.

From the above equations, it can be shown that the spin singlet can also be written as
$$\left|\psi\right\rangle = -\frac{1}{\sqrt{2}} \biggl(
\left|+x\right\rangle \otimes \left|-x\right\rangle -
\left|-x\right\rangle \otimes \left|+x\right\rangle
\biggr),$$
where the terms on the right hand side are what we have referred to as state Ia and state IIa.

To illustrate the paradox, we need to show that after Alice's measurement of S_{z} (or S_{x}), Bob's value of S_{z} (or S_{x}) is uniquely determined and Bob's value of S_{x} (or S_{z}) is uniformly random. This follows from the principles of measurement in quantum mechanics. When S_{z} is measured, the system state $|\psi\rangle$ collapses into an eigenvector of S_{z}. If the measurement result is +z, this means that immediately after measurement the system state collapses to
$$\left| +z \right\rangle \otimes \left| -z \right\rangle = \left| +z \right\rangle \otimes \frac{\left| +x \right\rangle - \left| -x \right\rangle}{\sqrt2}.$$

Similarly, if Alice's measurement result is −z, the state collapses to
$$\left|-z\right\rangle \otimes \left|+z\right\rangle = \left| -z \right\rangle \otimes \frac{\left| +x \right\rangle + \left| -x \right\rangle}{\sqrt2}.$$
The left hand side of both equations show that the measurement of S_{z} on Bob's positron is now determined, it will be −z in the first case or +z in the second case. The right hand side of the equations show that the measurement of S_{x} on Bob's positron will return, in both cases, +x or −x with probability 1/2 each.

== See also ==
- Aspect's experiment
- Bohr-Einstein debates: The argument of EPR
- Coherence
- Correlation does not imply causation
- CHSH inequality
- ER = EPR
- GHZ experiment
- Measurement problem
- Philosophy of information
- Philosophy of physics
- Popper's experiment
- Superdeterminism
- Quantum entanglement
- Quantum information
- Quantum pseudo-telepathy
- Quantum teleportation
- Quantum Zeno effect
- Synchronicity
- Ward's probability amplitude
