= The Logic of Scientific Discovery =

1959 book by Karl Popper

- Cover of the first edition
- Author: Karl Popper
- Original title: Logik der Forschung
- Cover artist: Dibakar Das
- Language: German
- Subject: Philosophy of science
- Publisher: Julius Springer, Hutchinson & Co
- Publication date: 1934
- English publication date: 1959
- Media type: Print
- Pages: 513 (2002 & 2005 Routledge editions)
- ISBN: 3-1614-8410-X (2005 German edition); 0-4152-7844-9 (2002 Psychology Press edition); 1-1344-7002-9 (2005 Routledge revised edition)
- OCLC: 62448100

The Logic of Scientific Discovery is a 1959 book about the philosophy of science by the philosopher Karl Popper. Popper rewrote his book in English from the 1934 (imprint '1935') German original, titled Logik der Forschung. Zur Erkenntnistheorie der modernen Naturwissenschaft, which literally translates as, "Logic of Research: On the Epistemology of Modern Natural Science"'.

== Summary ==
Popper argues that science should adopt a methodology based on falsifiability, because no number of experiments can ever prove a theory, but a reproducible experiment or observation can refute one. According to Popper: "non-reproducible single occurrences are of no significance to science. Thus a few stray basic statements contradicting a theory will hardly induce us to reject it as falsified. We shall take it as falsified only if we discover a reproducible effect which refutes the theory". Popper argues that science should adopt a methodology based on "an asymmetry between verifiability and falsifiability; an asymmetry which results from the logical form of universal statements. For these are never derivable from singular statements, but can be contradicted by singular statements".

== Reception ==
The psychologist Harry Guntrip wrote that its publication "greatly stimulated the discussion of the nature of scientific knowledge", including by philosophers who did not completely agree with Popper, such as Thomas Kuhn and Horace Romano Harré. The psychiatrist Carl Jung, founder of analytical psychology, valued the work. The biographer Vincent Brome recalls Jung remarking in 1938 that it exposed "some of the shortcomings of science". The philosopher Paul Ricœur endorsed "procedures of invalidation" similar to Popper's criteria for falsifiability. The historian Peter Gay described the work as "an important treatise in epistemology". The philosopher Bryan Magee considered Popper's criticisms of logical positivism "devastating". In his view, Popper's most important argument against logical positivism is that, while it claimed to be a scientific theory of the world, its central tenet, the verification principle, effectively destroyed all of science. The physicists Alan Sokal and Jean Bricmont argued that critiques of Popper's work have provoked an "irrationalist drift", and that a significant part of the problems that currently affect the philosophy of science "can be traced to ambiguities or inadequacies" in The Logic of Scientific Discovery. The essayist Nassim Nicholas Taleb, in his book The Black Swan, mentions Popper's theory of falsification as a way to combat the effects of confirmation bias, crediting his "insight concerning the fundamental, severe, and incurable unpredictability of the world."
