= Epistemological Letters =

Quantum physics newsletter, 1973 to 1984

- Discipline: Quantum physics
- Language: English
- Edited by: Abner Shimony and others

Publication details
- History: 1973–1984
- Publisher: L'Institut de la Méthode of the Association Ferdinand Gonseth (Switzerland)
- Frequency: Irregular

Standard abbreviations
- ISO 4: Epistemol. Lett.

Indexing
- OCLC no.: 52305299

Epistemological Letters (French: Lettres Épistémologiques) was a hand-typed, mimeographed "underground" newsletter about quantum physics that was distributed to a private mailing list, described by the physicist and Nobel laureate John Clauser as a "quantum subculture", between 1973 and 1984.

Distributed by a Swiss foundation, the newsletter was created because mainstream academic journals were reluctant to publish articles about the philosophy of quantum mechanics, especially anything that implied support for ideas such as action at a distance. Thirty-six or thirty-seven issues of Epistemological Letters appeared, each between four and eighty-nine pages long. Several well-known scientists published their work there, including the physicist John Bell, the originator of Bell's theorem. According to John Clauser, much of the early work on Bell's theorem was published only in Epistemological Letters.

== Interpretations of quantum physics ==
According to the Irish physicist Andrew Whitaker, a powerful group of physicists centred on Niels Bohr, Wolfgang Pauli and Werner Heisenberg made clear that "there was no place in physics – no jobs in physics! – for anybody who dared to question the Copenhagen interpretation" (Bohr's interpretation) of quantum theory. John Clauser writes that any inquiry into the "wonders and peculiarities" of quantum mechanics and quantum entanglement that went outside the "party line" was prohibited, in what he argues amounted to an "evangelical crusade". Samuel Goudsmit, editor of the prestigious Physical Review and Physical Review Letters until he retired in 1974, imposed a formal ban on the philosophical debate, issuing instructions to referees that they should feel free to reject material that even hinted at it.

== Alternative publications ==
Articles questioning the mainstream position were therefore distributed in alternative publications, and Epistemological Letters became one of the main conduits. The newsletter was sent out by the L'Institut de la Méthode of the Association Ferdinand Gonseth, which had been established in honour of the philosopher Ferdinand Gonseth. The newsletter described itself as "an open and informal journal allowing confrontation and ripening of ideas before publishing in some adequate journal." According to Clauser, it announced that the usual stigma against discussing certain ideas, such as hidden-variable theories, was to be absent. The newsletter's editors included Abner Shimony.

Several eminent physicists published their material in Epistemological Letters, including John Bell, the originator of Bell's theorem. Clauser writes that much of the early work on Bell's theorem was published only in Epistemological Letters. Bell's paper, "The Theory of Local Beables" (beable, as opposed to observable, referring to something that exists independently of any observer), appeared there in March 1976. Abner Shimony, John Clauser and Michael Horne published responses to it, also in the Letters. Henry Stapp was another prominent physicist who wrote for the Letters. H. Dieter Zeh published a paper in the Letters on the many-minds interpretation of quantum mechanics in 1981.

== Digitization of the Epistemological Letters ==
Don Howard, Professor of Philosophy at the University of Notre Dame, was a Ph.D. student of Abner Shimony, one of the editors of the newsletter; as such, he had an almost complete set. In collaboration with Sebastian Murgueitio Ramirez (then his graduate student, now assistant professor of philosophy at Purdue University), the set was completed and digitized in 2018–2019, in order to make this very rare document available to the community of historians and philosophers of physics. The entire set is available to the public at the Epistemological Letters digital archive, and the original newsletter is in Special Collections at the University Library.

== See also ==
- Fundamental Fysiks Group
- Physics Physique Физика
