= Buscemi nonlocality =

Concept in quantum theory

Buscemi nonlocality, a concept proposed by Francesco Buscemi in 2012, refers to a type of quantum nonlocality that arises in Bell tests where the local measurement settings are determined not by classical programs but by quantum states. Such generalized tests are called semiquantum nonlocal games. While, as the counterexample of Werner states shows, Bell nonlocality is known not to be equivalent to quantum entanglement, the latter instead turns out to be equivalent to Buscemi nonlocality: a quantum state is "Buscemi nonlocal" if and only if it is entangled.

Semiquantum nonlocal tests constitute the basis for measurement device-independent entanglement witnesses and their feasibility has been experimentally verified several times. Buscemi nonlocality has been given an operational interpretation similar to that of standard Bell nonlocality in the framework of quantum resource theories. It also motivates the study of quantum entanglement based not on the LOCC framework, but rather on the Local Operations and Shared Randomness (LOSR) framework.
