= GHZ =

GHZ or GHz may refer to:

- Chabab Ghazieh SC, a Lebanese association football club
- Gigahertz (GHz), unit of frequency
- Greenberger–Horne–Zeilinger state, a specific entangled quantum state of three or more particles
  - GHZ experiment, an experiment associated with such a state
- Galactic Habitable Zone, the region of a galaxy that is favorable to the formation of life
- Green Hill Zone, the first level in Sonic the Hedgehog
