= Wave–particle duality relation =

Relation in quantum optics

The wave–particle duality relation, also called the Englert–Greenberger–Yasin duality relation, or the Englert–Greenberger relation, relates the visibility, $V$, of interference fringes with the definiteness, or distinguishability, $D$, of the photons' paths in quantum optics. As an inequality:

$$D^2+ V^2\le 1 \,$$

Although it is treated as a single relation, it actually involves two separate relations, which mathematically look very similar. The first relation, derived by Daniel Greenberger and Allaine Yasin in 1988, is expressed as $P^2+ V^2\le 1 \,$. It was later extended to, providing an equality for the case of pure quantum states by Gregg Jaeger, Abner Shimony, and Lev Vaidman in 1995. This relation involves correctly guessing which of the two paths the particle would have taken, based on the initial preparation. Here $P$ can be called the predictability. A year later Berthold-Georg Englert, in 1996, derived a related relation dealing with experimentally acquiring knowledge of the two paths using an apparatus, as opposed to predicting the path based on initial preparation. This relation is $D^2+ V^2\le 1 \,$. Here $D$ is called the distinguishability. Since $\left| P \right|\le \left| D \right|$, the former relation is a consequence of the Englert 1996 relation. The inequality $\left| P \right|\le \left| D \right|$ means that the which-way detector can only add to the predictability.

The significance of the relations is that they express quantitatively the complementarity of wave and particle viewpoints in double-slit experiments. The complementarity principle in quantum mechanics, formulated by Niels Bohr, says that the wave and particle aspects of quantum objects cannot be observed at the same time. The wave–particle duality relations makes Bohr's statement more quantitative – an experiment can yield partial information about the wave and particle aspects of a photon simultaneously, but the more information a particular experiment gives about one, the less it will give about the other. The predictability $P$ which expresses the degree of probability with which path of the particle can be correctly guessed, and the distinguishability $D$ which is the degree to which one can experimentally acquire information about the path of the particle, are measures of the particle information, while the visibility of the fringes $V$ is a measure of the wave information. The relations shows that they are inversely related, as one goes up, the other goes down. Fringes are visible over a wide range of distinguishability.

== The mathematics of two-slit diffraction ==
This section reviews the mathematical formulation of the double-slit experiment. The formulation is in terms of the diffraction and interference of waves. The culmination of the development is a presentation of two numbers that characterizes the visibility of the interference fringes in the experiment, linked together as the Englert–Greenberger duality relation. The next section will discuss the orthodox quantum mechanical interpretation of the duality relation in terms of wave–particle duality.

The wave function in the Young double-aperture experiment can be written as

$$\Psi_\text{Total}(x) = \Psi_A(x)+\Psi_B(x).$$

The function

$$\Psi_A(x)=C_A \Psi_0(x-x_A)$$

is the wave function associated with the pinhole at A centered on $x_A$; a similar relation holds for pinhole B. The variable $x$ is a position in space downstream of the slits. The constants $C_A$ and $C_B$ are proportionality factors for the corresponding wave amplitudes, and $\Psi_0(x)$ is the single hole wave function for an aperture centered on the origin. The single-hole wave-function is taken to be that of Fraunhofer diffraction; the pinhole shape is irrelevant, and the pinholes are considered to be idealized. The wave is taken to have a fixed incident momentum $p_0=h/\lambda$:

$$\Psi_0(x)\propto \frac{e^{ip_0\cdot|x|/\hbar}} {|x|}$$

where $|x|$ is the radial distance from the pinhole.

To distinguish which pinhole a photon passed through, one needs some measure of the distinguishability between pinholes. Such a measure is given by

$$P=|P_A-P_B|, \,$$

where $P_{A}$ and $P_{B}$ are the probabilities of finding that the particle passed through aperture A and aperture B respectively.

Since the Born probability measure is given by

$$P_A=\frac{|C_A|^2}{|C_A|^2+|C_B|^2}$$

and

$$P_B=\frac{|C_B|^2}{|C_A|^2+|C_B|^2}$$

then we get:

$$P=\left|\;\frac{|C_A|^2-|C_B|^2}{|C_A|^2+|C_B|^2}\,\right|$$

We have in particular $P=0$ for two symmetric holes and $P=1$ for a single aperture (perfect distinguishability). In the far-field of the two pinholes the two waves interfere and produce fringes. The intensity of the interference pattern at a point y in the focal plane is given by

$$I(y)\propto 1+V\cos \left( \frac{p_yd}\hbar+\varphi\right)$$

where $p_y= h/\lambda\cdot \sin(\alpha)$ is the momentum of the particle along the y direction, $\varphi=\operatorname{Arg}(C_A)-\operatorname{Arg}(C_B)$ is a fixed phase shift, and $d$ is the separation between the two pinholes. The angle α from the horizontal is given by $\sin(\alpha)\simeq \tan(\alpha)=y/L$ where $L$ is the distance between the aperture screen and the far field analysis plane. If a lens is used to observe the fringes in the rear focal plane, the angle is given by $\sin(\alpha)\simeq \tan(\alpha)=y/f$ where $f$ is the focal length of the lens.

The visibility of the fringes is defined by

$$V=\frac{I_\max-I_\min}{I_\max+I_\min}$$

where $I_{\max}$ and $I_{\min}$ denote the maximum and minimum intensity of the fringes respectively. By the rules of constructive and destructive interference we have

$$I_{\max} \propto ||C_A|+|C_B||^2$$

$$I_{\min} \propto ||C_A|-|C_B||^2$$

Equivalently, this can be written as

$$V=2\frac{|C_A\cdot C_B^*|}{|C_A|^2+|C_B|^2}.$$

And hence we get, for a single photon in a pure quantum state, the duality relation

$$V^2+P^2 = 1 \,$$

There are two extremal cases with a straightforward intuitive interpretation: In a single hole experiment, the fringe visibility is zero (as there are no fringes). That is, $V=0$ but $P=1$ since we know (by definition) which hole the photon passed through. On the other hand, for a two slit configuration, where the two slits are indistinguishable with $P=0$, one has perfect visibility with $I_{\min} = 0$ and hence $V=1$. Hence in both these extremal cases we also have $V^2+P^2=1$.

The above presentation was limited to a pure quantum state. More generally, for a mixture of quantum states, one will have

$$V^2+P^2\leq 1. \,$$

For the remainder of the development, we assume the light source is a laser, so that we can assume $V^2+P^2=1$ holds, following from the coherence properties of laser light.

== Complementarity ==
The mathematical discussion presented above does not require quantum mechanics at its heart. In particular, the derivation is essentially valid for waves of any sort. With slight modifications to account for the squaring of amplitudes, the derivation could be applied to, for example, sound waves or water waves in a ripple tank.

For the relation to be a precise formulation of Bohr complementarity, one must introduce wave–particle duality in the discussion. This means one must consider both wave and particle behavior of light on an equal footing. Wave–particle duality implies that one must A) use the unitary evolution of the wave before the observation and B) consider the particle aspect after the detection (this is called the Heisenberg–von Neumann collapse postulate). Indeed, since one could only observe the photon in one point of space (a photon can not be absorbed twice) this implies that the meaning of the wave function is essentially statistical and cannot be confused with a classical wave (such as those that occur in air or water).

In this context the direct observation of a photon in the aperture plane precludes the following recording of the same photon in the focal plane (F). Reciprocally the observation in (F) means that we did not absorb the photon before. If both holes are open this implies that we don't know where we would have detected the photon in the aperture plane. $P$ defines thus the predictability of the two holes A and B.

A maximal value of predictability $P=1$ means that only one hole (say A) is open. If now we detect the photon at (F), we know that that photon would have been detected in A necessarily. Conversely, $P=0$ means that both holes are open and play a symmetric role. If we detect the photon at (F), we don't know where the photon would have been detected in the aperture plane and $P=0$ characterizes our ignorance.

Similarly, if $P=0$ then $V=1$ and this means that a statistical accumulation of photons at (F) builds up an interference pattern with maximal visibility. Conversely, $P=1$ implies $V=0$ and thus, no fringes appear after a statistical recording of several photons.

The above treatment formalizes wave particle duality for the double-slit experiment.

== See also ==
- Afshar experiment
- Quantum entanglement
- Quantum indeterminacy
