= Daniel Greenberger =

American quantum physicist

Daniel M. Greenberger
- Education: Massachusetts Institute of Technology; University of Illinois
- Known for: Quantum entanglement Greenberger–Horne–Zeilinger state Englert–Greenberger relation
- Scientific career
- Fields: Physicist
- Workplaces: City College of New York
- Doctoral advisor: Francis E. Low

Daniel M. Greenberger is an American quantum physicist. He has been professor of physics at the City College of New York since 1964. He is also a fellow of the American Physical Society and—alongside Anton Zeilinger—founded the APS Topical Group on Quantum Information.

== Biography ==
Daniel Greenberger graduated in 1950 from the Bronx High School of Science. He then graduated in 1954 from MIT, where he conducted his thesis under Laszlo Tisza. He received his MS (1956) and PhD (1958) from the University of Illinois, where his advisor was Francis E. Low.

After graduation, he spent two years in the US Army at a physics research lab connected to the NSA, working as a cryptanalyst, which eventually sparked his interest in quantum cryptography.

From 1961 to 1963 he was a postdoctoral fellow at UC Berkeley in Geoffrey Chew's high-energy theory group. In 1964, he became a faculty member at the City College of New York. Greenberger soon became interested in gravity. Around 1970, he went to MIT to see Clifford Shull to test the equivalence principle with neutrons from the university's reactor. As the reactor had been down for maintenance, Roberto Collela, Albert Overhauser, and Sam Werner devised a better way to do the experiment using a neutron interferometer.

During a conference at Grenoble in France in 1978, Greenberger met with Michael Horne and Anton Zeilinger, which—by 1986—would eventually prove to be an important collaboration in the development of the Greenberger-Horne-Zeilinger state, a much improved version of Bell's theorem in quantum mechanics. In 1988, Greenberger won a Humboldt senior scientist award and went to Munich in 1988 to work at the Max Planck Institute of Quantum Optics in Garching.

== Work and current research ==
Together with Anton Zeilinger and Michael Horne, Greenberger wrote the first paper on quantum entanglement beyond two particles. The resulting GHZ theorem (see Greenberger-Horne-Zeilinger state) is fundamental for quantum physics, as it provides the most succinct contradiction between local realism and the predictions of quantum mechanics. Also, GHZ states were the first instances of multi-particle entanglement ever investigated. Such states have become essential in quantum information science. GHZ states are now even an individual entry in the PACS code.

Currently Greenberger is still working on entangled states—especially with many particles. He continues to be an editorial board member and managing editor of the Fortschritte der Physik, International Journal of Quantum Physics and Foundations of Physics.
