= Marissa Giustina =

American physicist

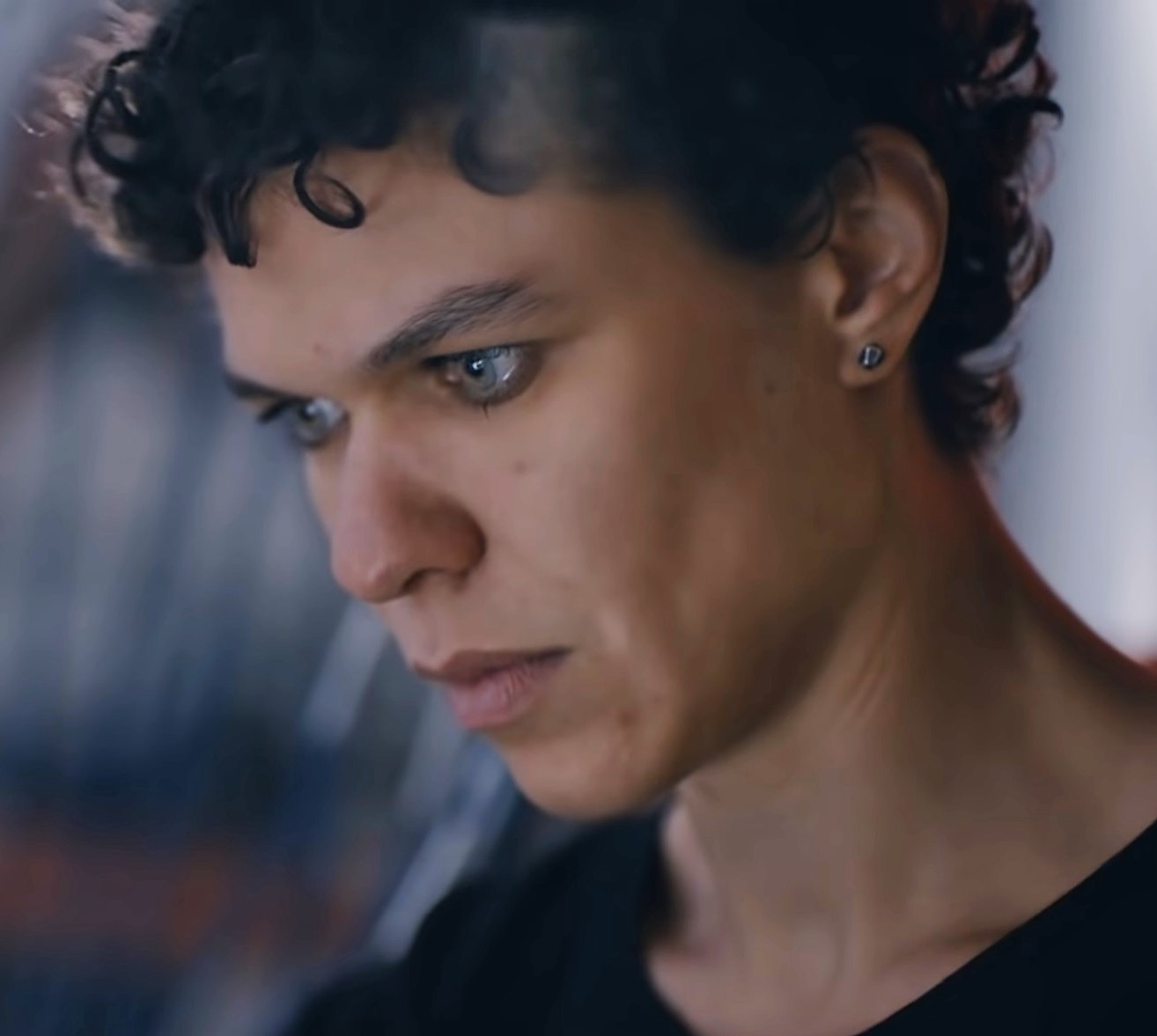
- Giustina in 2019
- Education: Thayer School of Engineering; University of Vienna
- Scientific career
- Workplaces: Quantum Artificial Intelligence Lab
- Thesis: Characterizing photoresponse in black silicon at excitation below the silicon bandgap (2010)

Marissa Giustina is an American physicist who is a senior research scientist at the Quantum Artificial Intelligence Lab. Her research considers the development of quantum computing and experimental tests of quantum theory.

== Early life and education ==
Giustina became interested in computing as a child. She was an undergraduate student in mathematics at the Mary Baldwin University, where she had one woman physics teacher, who inspired her to pursue a career in engineering. She moved to the Thayer School of Engineering at Dartmouth College for undergraduate and graduate studies, where she was mentored by Lorenza Viola. Her research considered the photoresponse of black silicon below the silicon bandgap. She moved to the University of Vienna in 2010, where she started doctoral research in the Institute for Quantum Optics and Quantum Information. As part of her research, she developed an experiment to demonstrate quantum entanglement. The equipment was based at the Hofburg Palace , and generated entangled pairs of photons which were coupled into glass fibres that were carried to measurement stations. The measurement stations included a random number generator to choose which orientation to measure the photon polarization in, and superconducting detectors to determine whether the photons had arrived. Her research provided validation for quantum entanglement. The extraordinary detection sensitivity and spatial separation between the pair of detectors were enough to make the result a definitive proof of entanglement. Her research on loophole-free texting of Bell experiments was recognized with the Paul Ehrenfest Best Paper Award.

== Research and career ==
Giustina joined the Google Quantum Artificial Intelligence Lab in 2016. She develops quantum computers, which store information in a compressed form using quantum states. Her quantum computers are based on nonlinear superconducting elements, which comprise a Josephson junction integrated as a non-linear element. This type of circuit operates at frequencies close to 5 GHz and produces two discrete states (0 and 1) as well as superpositions of states. She is working to improve the functionality of quantum processors and attempting overcome decoherence.

Giustina serves on the advisory board of the United States Department of Energy National Quantum Initiative Advisory Committee. In 2020, she was selected as one of Fortune's 40 Under 40, and in 2021 she was listed in the Future Tech Awards Future 50.

In 2021, Giustina took part in Homeward Bound, an Australian leadership program.

== Selected publications ==
- Marissa Giustina; Marijn A M Versteegh; Sören Wengerowsky; et al. (2015). "Significant-Loophole-Free Test of Bell's Theorem with Entangled Photons". Physical Review Letters. 115 (25) 250401. arXiv:1511.03190. doi:10.1103/physrevlett.115.250401. PMID 26722905. Wikidata Q50744887.
- Frank Arute; Kunal Arya; Ryan Babbush; et al. (2019). "Quantum supremacy using a programmable superconducting processor". Nature. 574 (7779): 505–510. arXiv:1910.11333. doi:10.1038/s41586-019-1666-5. PMID 31645734. Wikidata Q78878570.
- Marissa Giustina; Alexandra Mech; Sven Ramelow; et al. (2013). "Bell violation using entangled photons without the fair-sampling assumption". Nature. 497 (7448): 227–230. arXiv:1212.0533. doi:10.1038/nature12012. PMID 23584590. Wikidata Q46601665.
