= Greenberger–Horne–Zeilinger state =

"Highly entangled" quantum state of 3 or more qubits

Generation of the 3-qubit GHZ state using quantum logic gates.

In physics, in the area of quantum information theory, a Greenberger–Horne–Zeilinger (GHZ) state is an entangled quantum state that involves at least three subsystems (particle states, qubits, or qudits). Named for the three authors that first described this state, the GHZ state predicts outcomes from experiments that directly contradict predictions by every classical local hidden-variable theory. The state has applications in quantum computing.

== History ==
The four-particle version was first studied by Daniel Greenberger, Michael Horne and Anton Zeilinger in 1989, who predicted that it would lead to striking non-classical correlations inconsistent with any local hidden-variable theory. The following year Abner Shimony joined in and they published a three-particle version based on suggestions by N. David Mermin. The first laboratory observation of GHZ correlations was by the group of Anton Zeilinger, who was awarded a share of the 2022 Nobel Prize in physics for this work.

== Definition ==
The GHZ state is an entangled quantum state for 3 qubits and it can be written
$$|\mathrm{GHZ}\rangle = \frac{|000\rangle + |111\rangle}{\sqrt{2}}$$
where the 0 or 1 values of the qubit correspond to any two physical states. For example the two states may correspond to spin-down and spin-up along some physical axis. In physics applications the state may be written
$$|\mathrm{GHZ}\rangle = \frac{|1,1,1\rangle + |{-1},{-1},{-1}\rangle}{\sqrt{2}}$$
where the numbering of the states represents spin eigenvalues.

Another example of a GHZ state is three photons in an entangled state, with the photons being in a superposition of being all horizontally polarized (HHH) or all vertically polarized (VVV), with respect to some coordinate system. The GHZ state can be written in bra–ket notation as

$$|\mathrm{GHZ}\rangle=\frac{1}{\sqrt{2}}(|\mathrm{HHH}\rangle+|\mathrm{VVV}\rangle).$$

Prior to any measurements being made, the polarizations of the photons are indeterminate. If a measurement is made on one of the photons using a two-channel polarizer aligned with the axes of the coordinate system, each orientation will be observed with 50% probability. However the result of all three measurements on the state gives the same result: all three polarizations are observed along the same axis.

=== Generalization ===
The generalized GHZ state is an entangled quantum state of M > 2 subsystems. If each system has dimension d, i.e., the local Hilbert space is isomorphic to $\mathbb{C}^d$, then the total Hilbert space of an M-partite system is $\mathcal{H}_{\rm tot}=(\mathbb{C}^d)^{\otimes M}$. This GHZ state is also called an M-partite qudit GHZ state. Its formula as a tensor product is

$$|\mathrm{GHZ}\rangle=\frac{1}{\sqrt{d}}\sum_{i=0}^{d-1}|i\rangle\otimes\cdots\otimes|i\rangle=\frac{1}{\sqrt{d}}(|0\rangle\otimes\cdots\otimes|0\rangle+\cdots+|d-1\rangle\otimes\cdots\otimes|d-1\rangle)$$.

In the case of each of the subsystems being two-dimensional, that is for a collection of M qubits, it reads

$$|\mathrm{GHZ}\rangle = \frac{|0\rangle^{\otimes M} + |1\rangle^{\otimes M}}{\sqrt{2}}.$$

== GHZ experiment ==
The GHZ experiment demonstrates quantum nonlocality with the GHZ state. In a GHZ experiment, first a GHZ state is prepared, and its three qubits are spatially separated. Then a Pauli measurement, in either the $X$ basis or the $Y$ basis, is applied to each of the three qubits, yielding three results of either +1 or −1. The results are multiplied together, implementing a destructive multi-qubit Pauli measurement $P_1P_2P_3$, where $P_i \in \{X_i, Y_i\}$.

Quantum mechanics predicts that four of the possible multi-qubit Pauli operators to measure have expectation values ±1 (implying that these multi-qubit Pauli operators have deterministic values, since {±1} is also the set of possible measurement results):

$$\langle\mathrm{GHZ}|Y_1Y_2X_3|\mathrm{GHZ}\rangle = \langle\mathrm{GHZ}|Y_1X_2Y_3|\mathrm{GHZ}\rangle = \langle\mathrm{GHZ}|X_1Y_2Y_3|\mathrm{GHZ}\rangle = -1,$$
$$\langle\mathrm{GHZ}|X_1X_2X_3|\mathrm{GHZ}\rangle = +1,$$

which is consistent in quantum mechanics because all these multi-qubit Paulis commute with each other, and

$$Y_1Y_2X_3 \cdot Y_1X_2Y_3 \cdot X_1Y_2Y_3 \cdot X_1X_2X_3 = -1$$

due to the anticommutativity between $X$ and $Y$.

=== Photon implementation ===
The GHZ experiment was performed using photon polarization qubits, for which the basis states can be chosen to be horizontal and vertical polarization under a given coordinate system:

$$|0\rangle \equiv |\mathrm{H}\rangle, \qquad |1\rangle \equiv |\mathrm{V}\rangle.$$

With appropriately chosen phase factors for $|\mathrm{H}\rangle$ and $|\mathrm{V}\rangle$, both Pauli $X$ and $Y$ measurements can be implemented by two-channel polarizers:

- A linear polarizer rotated by 45° from the axes of the coordinate system implements a Pauli $X$ measurement, distinguishing between the eigenstates

$$|{+X}\rangle \equiv |+\rangle = \frac{1}{\sqrt{2}}(|\mathrm{H}\rangle + |\mathrm{V}\rangle), \qquad |{-X}\rangle \equiv |-\rangle = \frac{1}{\sqrt{2}}(|\mathrm{H}\rangle - |\mathrm{V}\rangle).$$

- A circular polarizer implements a Pauli $Y$ measurement, distinguishing between the eigenstates

$$|{+Y}\rangle \equiv |R\rangle = \frac{1}{\sqrt{2}}(|\mathrm{H}\rangle + i|\mathrm{V}\rangle), \qquad |{-Y}\rangle \equiv |L\rangle = \frac{1}{\sqrt{2}}(|\mathrm{H}\rangle - i|\mathrm{V}\rangle).$$

For example, to implement a $Y_1Y_2X_3$ measurement, one would apply circular polarizers on photons 1 and 2, and a 45° linear polarizer on photon 3. Quantum mechanics predict that the product of the results (each written as ±1) should be −1. In terms of photon polarization, only four result combinations are possible: {RL+, LR+, RR−, LL−}.

Within the experimental error, the results of the photon experiment agree with the predictions of quantum mechanics. Furthermore, the error rate is low enough (~15% for each measurement configuration) that the results are statistically in conflict with locality.

== Entanglement properties ==
=== Pairwise entanglement ===
An important property of the GHZ state is that taking the partial trace over one of the three qubits yields

$$\operatorname{Tr}_3\left[\left(\frac{|000\rangle + |111\rangle}{\sqrt{2}}\right)\left(\frac{\langle 000|+\langle 111|}{\sqrt{2}}\right) \right] = \frac{(|00\rangle \langle 00| + |11\rangle \langle 11|)}{2},$$

which is an unentangled mixed state. It has certain two-particle (qubit) correlations, but these are of a classical nature. This is also evidenced by the fact that measuring the third qubit in the Pauli Z basis will leave a product state $|00\rangle$ or $|11\rangle$ on the first two qubits, which are unentangled pure states.

However, measuring the third qubit in the Pauli X or Y basis can leave the first two qubits in a maximally entangled Bell state. The 3-qubit GHZ state written with the third qubit expressed in a Pauli X basis is:

$$\begin{align}
|\mathrm{GHZ}\rangle & =\frac{1}{\sqrt{2}}\left(|000\rangle + |111\rangle\right)\\
& = \frac{1}{\sqrt{2}}\left(|00\rangle \otimes \frac{|+\rangle + |-\rangle}{\sqrt{2}} + |11\rangle \otimes \frac{|+\rangle - |-\rangle}{\sqrt{2}}\right)\\
& = \frac{1}{2}\left(|00\rangle + |11\rangle \right) \otimes |+\rangle +
\frac{1}{2}\left(|00\rangle - |11\rangle\right) \otimes |-\rangle\\
& = \frac{1}{\sqrt{2}}\left(|\Phi^+\rangle \otimes |+\rangle +
|\Phi^-\rangle \otimes |-\rangle\right).
\end{align}$$

An X basis measurement of the third qubit that yields $|+\rangle$ selects $|\Phi^+\rangle =(|00\rangle + |11\rangle)/\sqrt{2}$; similarly, if $|-\rangle$ results then $|\Phi^-\rangle=(|00\rangle - |11\rangle)/\sqrt{2}$ is selected. Either case is a maximally entangled Bell state.

As a corollary, measurement statistics of the first two qubits will exhibit quantum nonlocality. However, the exact nature of this correlation depends on the measurement result of the third qubit, and thus it does not manifest when the latter measurement result is unknown. For example, measuring both qubits of $|\Phi^+\rangle$ in the X basis will always yield the same result, but the same measurement on $|\Phi^-\rangle$ will always yield opposite results. Therefore, when the measurement result of the third qubit is unknown, the X measurement results of the first two qubits appear uncorrelated. This phenomenon, where entanglement of two quantum systems are dependent on the measurement of a third system, was named "entangled entanglement" by Krenn and Zeilinger.

The correlation between the first two qubits can also be made definite by applying a local quantum gate depending on the measurement result of the third qubit. For example, when the result is $|-\rangle$, one can apply a Z gate to either of the first two qubit to transform $|\Phi^-\rangle$ into $|\Phi^+\rangle$. Therefore the 3-qubit GHZ state can be converted into a 2-qubit Bell state via local operations and classical communication.

=== Multi-partite entanglement ===
There is no standard measure of multi-partite entanglement because different, not mutually convertible, types of multi-partite entanglement exist. Nonetheless, many measures define the GHZ state to be a maximally entangled state.

A pure state $|\psi\rangle$ of $N$ parties is called biseparable, if one can find a partition of the parties in two nonempty disjoint subsets $A$ and $B$ with $A \cup B = \{1,\dots,N\}$ such that $|\psi\rangle = |\phi\rangle_A \otimes |\gamma\rangle_B$, i.e. $|\psi\rangle$ is a product state with respect to the partition $A|B$. The GHZ state is non-biseparable and is the representative of one of the two non-biseparable classes of 3-qubit states which cannot be transformed (not even probabilistically) into each other by local quantum operations, the other being the W state, $|\mathrm{W}\rangle = (|001\rangle + |010\rangle + |100\rangle)/\sqrt{3}$. Thus $|\mathrm{GHZ}\rangle$ and $|\mathrm{W}\rangle$ represent two very different kinds of entanglement for three or more particles.

The W state is, in a certain sense, "less entangled" than the GHZ state; however, that entanglement is more robust against qubit loss, in the sense that a 3-qubit W state remains a bipartite entangled state when one of the qubits is discarded. If one qubit is measured in the Z basis, the entanglement between the other two qubits is lost with probability 1/3, but is promoted to maximal entanglement with probability 2/3. By contrast, for the 3-qubit GHZ state, discarding a qubit results in a separable mixed state, and a Z measurement on a qubit will always leave behind a pure product state. Both the GHZ state and the W state can be generalized to systems with more than 3 qubits, and both retain their own characteristics: The N-qubit GHZ state becomes unentangled if even one qubit is lost, and the N-qubit W state keeps some entanglement even if only two qubits remain.

== Possible applications ==
GHZ states are used in several proposed protocols in quantum communication and quantum cryptography, for example, in secret sharing or in the quantum Byzantine agreement. GHZ states for large numbers of qubits are theorized to give enhanced performance for metrology compared to other qubit superposition states.

== See also ==
- Bell's theorem
- Local hidden-variable theory
- NOON state
- Quantum pseudo-telepathy
- Dicke state
