= John Clauser =

American physicist (born 1942)

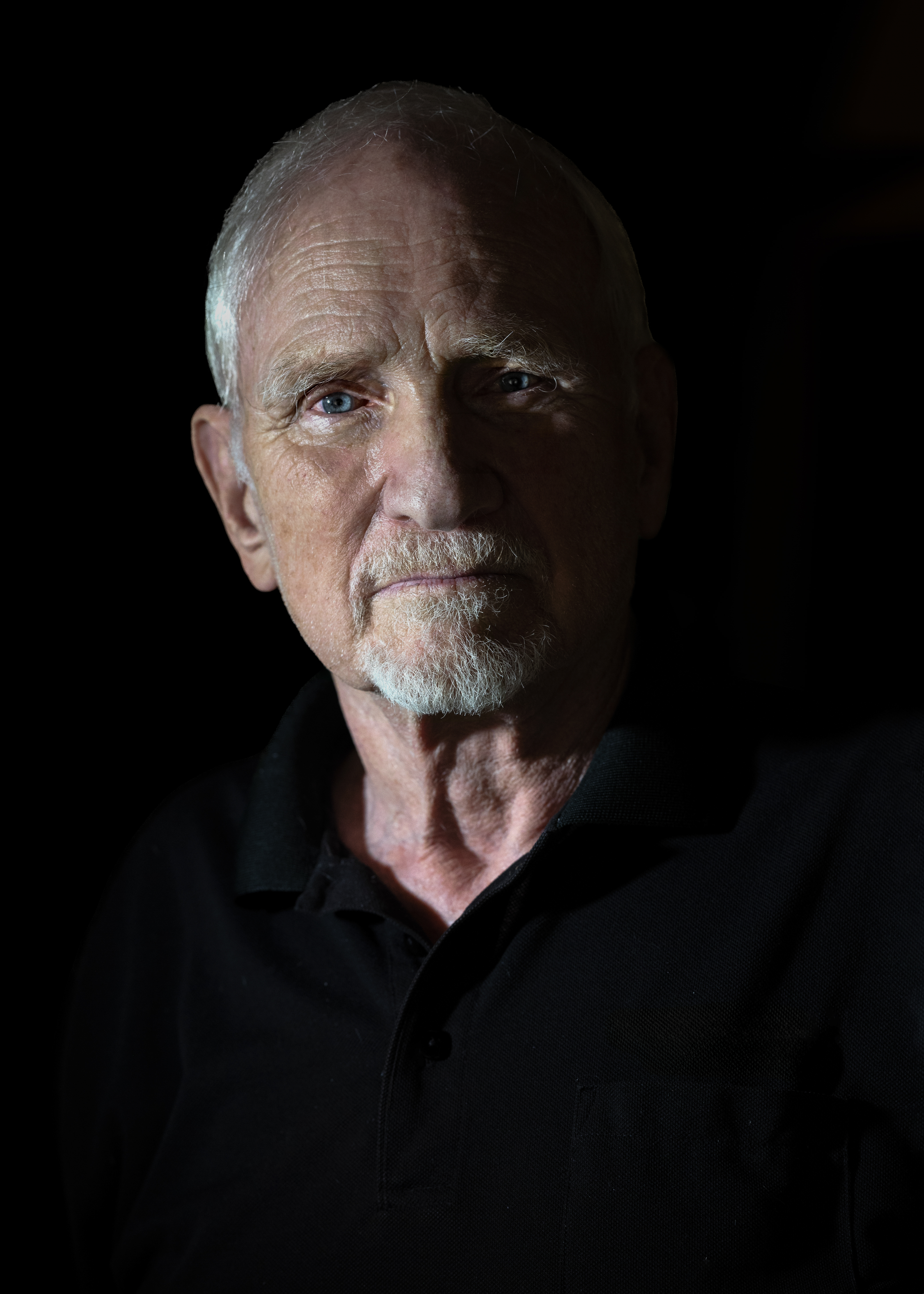
- John Clauser in 2024
- Born: John Francis Clauser; December 1, 1942 (age 83); Pasadena, California, U.S.
- Education: California Institute of Technology (BS); Columbia University (MA, PhD)
- Known for: Bell test experiments, CHSH inequality
- Awards: Wolf Prize in Physics (2010); Nobel Prize in Physics (2022)
- Scientific career
- Fields: Quantum mechanics
- Workplaces: University of California, Berkeley; Lawrence Berkeley National Laboratory; Lawrence Livermore National Laboratory; CO2 Coalition
- Thesis: Measurement of the Cosmic Microwave Background by Optical Observations of Interstellar Molecules (1970)
- Doctoral advisor: Patrick Thaddeus
- Website: johnclauser.com

John Francis Clauser (/ˈklaʊzər/; born December 1, 1942) is an American theoretical and experimental physicist known for contributions to the foundations of quantum mechanics, in particular the Clauser–Horne–Shimony–Holt inequality. Clauser was awarded the 2022 Nobel Prize in Physics, jointly with Alain Aspect and Anton Zeilinger "for experiments with entangled photons, establishing the violation of Bell inequalities and pioneering quantum information science". In 2023, he declared himself as a climate change denier.

== Early life ==
Clauser was born in Pasadena, California. His father, Francis H. Clauser, was a professor of aeronautical engineering who founded and chaired the aeronautics department at Johns Hopkins University. He later served as the Clark Blanchard Millikan Professor of Engineering at the California Institute of Technology (Caltech). His mother, Catharine McMillan, was the humanities librarian at Caltech and sister of 1951 Nobel Prize in Chemistry laureate Edwin McMillan.

He received a Bachelor of Science in physics from Caltech in 1964, where he was a member of Dabney House. He received a Master of Arts in physics in 1966 and a Doctor of Philosophy in physics in 1969 from Columbia University under the direction of Patrick Thaddeus.

== Career ==
From 1969 to 1975, he worked as a postdoctoral researcher at the University of California, Berkeley and Lawrence Berkeley National Laboratory. In 1972, working with Berkeley graduate student Stuart Freedman, he carried out the first experimental test of the CHSH-Bell's theorem predictions. This was the first experimental observation of a violation of a Bell inequality. In 1974, working with Michael Horne, he first showed that a generalization of Bell's Theorem provides severe constraints for all local realistic theories of nature (a.k.a. objective local theories). That work introduced the Clauser–Horne (CH) inequality as the first fully general experimental requirement set by local realism. It also introduced the "CH no-enhancement assumption", whereupon the CH inequality reduces to the CHSH inequality, and whereupon associated experimental tests also constrain local realism. Also in 1974 he made the first observation of sub-Poissonian statistics for light (via a violation of the Cauchy–Schwarz inequality for classical electromagnetic fields), and thereby, for the first time, demonstrated an unambiguous particle-like character for photons.

Starting in 1973, Clauser published the newsletter Epistemological Letters, which was created because mainstream academic journals were relunctant to publish articles about the philosophy of quantum mechanics. Clauser worked as a research physicist mainly at Lawrence Livermore and Berkeley from 1975 to 1997. In 1976 he carried out the world's second experimental test of the CHSH-Bell's Theorem predictions.

Clauser was awarded the Wolf Prize in Physics in 2010 together with Alain Aspect and Anton Zeilinger. The three were also jointly awarded the 2022 Nobel Prize in Physics.

=== Climate change denial ===
In May 2023, Clauser joined the board of the CO_{2} Coalition, a climate change denial organization. Later that year, Clauser called himself a "climate denier" and claimed "there is no climate crisis". Clauser's views on climate change have been described as "pseudoscience". His belief that cloud cover has more of an impact on Earth's temperature than carbon dioxide emissions is contradicted by the overwhelming scientific consensus on climate change.

== Personal life ==
Clauser is an atheist. He has emphysema due to smoking cigarettes in his youth.
