= Michael Horne (physicist) =

American quantum physicist (1943–2019)

- Born: January 18, 1943; Gulfport, Mississippi, USA
- Died: January 19, 2019 (aged 76); Dorchester, Massachusetts, USA
- Education: University of Mississippi; Boston University
- Known for: Quantum Entanglement; Greenberger–Horne–Zeilinger state CHSH inequality
- Scientific career
- Fields: Physicist
- Workplaces: Stonehill College
- Doctoral advisor: Abner Shimony

Michael Allan Horne (January 18, 1943 – January 19, 2019) was an American quantum physicist, known for his work on the foundations of quantum mechanics.

== Biography ==
Horne studied at the University of Mississippi and earned his doctorate in physics at Boston University with Abner Shimony. He taught at Stonehill College, a catholic school in Easton in the south of Boston.

Together with John Clauser, Abner Shimony and Richard A. Holt he developed the CHSH inequality for experimentally testing Bell's theorem (the test was conducted in 1972 by John Clauser and Stuart Freedman). In 1975 he started to investigate neutron interferometry in collaboration with Clifford Shull at MIT (at this time, neutron interference experiments were being developed by Sam Werner at the University of Missouri and by Helmut Rauch and Anton Zeilinger at the University of Vienna). This led to an encounter with Daniel Greenberger, who had already theoretically proposed neutron interferometry for gravitation in the 1960s and was also interested in Shull's experiment, and later with Zeilinger (in Grenoble 1978).

With Daniel Greenberger and Anton Zeilinger in 1989 he introduced quantum entangled states of three subsystems (Greenberger–Horne–Zeilinger states) which was first experimentally realized in 1998 and represents a conceptual improvement over experiments based on Bell's inequality, as the violation with local realism was now a deterministic consequence predicted by quantum physics. GHZ states were the first examples of quantum entanglement with more than two particles and play a fundamental role in quantum information theory. Along with Gregg Jaeger and Abner Shimony, he later found a novel complementarity relation interferometric visibility in two-particle quantum interferometry.

== Selected works ==
- with J. Clauser, Abner Shimony, Richard Holt: Proposed experiment to test local hidden variable theories. In: Physical Review Letters. Band 23, 1969, S. 880.
- with J. Clauser: Experimental consequences of objective local theories. In: Physical Review D. Band 10, 1974, S. 526
