= Abner Shimony =

American physicist and philosopher

Abner Eliezer Shimony
- Born: March 10, 1928; Columbus, Ohio, USA
- Died: August 8, 2015 (aged 87); New Haven, Connecticut, USA
- Education: Yale University; University of Chicago; Princeton University
- Known for: CHSH inequality
- Awards: Lakatos Prize
- Scientific career
- Fields: Philosophy of science Quantum foundations
- Workplaces: MIT; Boston University
- Doctoral advisor: John Myhill; Eugene Wigner
- Doctoral students: Michael Horne

Abner Eliezer Shimony (/ʃɪˈmoʊni/; March 10, 1928 – August 8, 2015) was an American physicist and philosopher. He specialized in quantum theory and philosophy of science. As a physicist, he concentrated on the interaction between relativity theory and quantum mechanics. He authored many works and research on complementarity in quantum entanglement as well as multiparticle quantum interferometry, both relating to quantum coherence. He authored research articles and books on the foundations of quantum mechanics. He received the 1996 Lakatos Prize for his work in philosophy of science. Shimony is also the author of Tibaldo and the Hole in the Calendar, a 1998 children's book about the calendar reform that has been translated into many languages.

== Education ==
Shimony was born in Columbus, Ohio. He obtained his BA in Mathematics and Philosophy from Yale University in 1948, and an MA in Philosophy from the University of Chicago in 1950. He obtained his Ph.D. in philosophy from Yale University in 1953 under the supervision of John Myhill, and served in the U.S. Army Signal Corps from 1953 to 1955. Shimony acquired his second doctorate in physics from Princeton University in 1962 under the supervision of Eugene Wigner with a thesis titled Regression and Response in Thermodynamic Systems.

== Career ==
After receiving his second Ph.D., Shimony interacted with both the philosophical academic world and the physics academic world. His most famous professional correspondence is with Rudolf Carnap. He taught philosophy of science at MIT from 1959 until 1968 in the school's Department of Humanities. In 1968 he transferred to Boston University, beginning a 26-year appointment in both the physics and philosophy departments, and was professor emeritus there until his death in 2015. Shimony is best known for his work in developing the CHSH inequality, an empirically testable form of the Bell inequality, also known as Bell's theorem. He later proposed a geometric measure of quantum entanglement and, along with Gregg Jaeger and Michael Horne, discovered two novel complementarity relations involving interferometric visibility in multiparticle quantum interferometry.

He is also known for his inquiry into the question of the "peaceful coexistence" of quantum mechanics and special relativity. He wrote several books and numerous research articles on the foundations of quantum mechanics and related topics. Shimony is credited with coining the phrase "passion at a distance" to characterize the various phenomena described by quantum correlations in 1984.

In 1996 he was awarded the Lakatos Award in the philosophy of science for the two-volume collection of papers, The Search for a Naturalistic World View, spanning his career up until 1992. He served as president of the Philosophy of Science Association from 1995 to 1996. He died in New Haven, Connecticut, aged 87.

Shimony was married to the noted anthropologist Annemarie Anrod Shimony, from 1951 until her death in 1995.

== Selected publications ==
Primary

- 1987. Edited by Abner Shimony & Debra Nails; Naturalistic Epistemology: A Symposium of Two Decades (Boston Studies in the Philosophy of Science Volume 100) ISBN 90-277-2337-0
- 1993. Selected Papers, Search for a Naturalistic World View, Volume 1, Scientific Method and Epistemology ISBN 0-521-37352-2
- 1993. Selected Papers, Search for a Naturalistic World View, Volume 2, Natural Science and Metaphysics ISBN 0-521-37353-0
- 1998, Tibaldo and the Hole in the Calendar ISBN 0-387-94935-6

Secondary

- 1977. Edited by Abner Shimony; Rudolf Carnap; Two Essays on Entropy ISBN 0-520-02715-9
- 1997. Edited by Robert S. Cohen, Michael Horne & John Stachel; Experimental Metaphysics: Quantum Mechanical Studies for Abner Shimony, Volume 1 (Boston Studies in the Philosophy of Science Volume 193) ISBN 978-0-7923-4452-0
- 1997. Edited by Robert S. Cohen, Michael Horne & John Stachel; Potentiality, Entanglement and Passion-at-a-Distance: Quantum Mechanical Studies for Abner Shimony, Volume 2 (Boston Studies in the Philosophy of Science Volume 194) ISBN 0-7923-4453-7
- 1997. Edited by Malcolm Longair; Roger Penrose with Abner Shimony, Nancy Cartwright and Stephen Hawking; The Large, the Small and the Human Mind ISBN 0-521-56330-5
- 2006. Edited by Abner Shimony; Martin Eger; Science, Understanding, and Justice: Philosophical Essays ISBN 0-8126-9461-9
- 2009. Edited by Wayne C. Myrvold & Joy Christian; Quantum Reality, Relativistic Causality, and Closing the Epistemic Circle: Essays in Honour of Abner Shimony ISBN 978-1-4020-9106-3

== See also ==
- Englert–Greenberger duality relation
- Epistemological Letters
