= Free will theorem =

Quantum physics theorem on causality

The free will theorem of John H. Conway and Simon B. Kochen states that if we have free will in the sense that our choices are not a function of the past, then, under specific assumptions drawn from quantum mechanics and relativity, so must some elementary particles. That is, if human experimenters possess a form of free will—defined as the ability to make choices not entirely determined by prior events—then certain elementary particles must also exhibit a corresponding form of indeterminacy. The theorem argues that stochastic processes do not satisfy this definition of "freedom," because random values can, in principle, be pre-determined or embedded in the past (for example, sampled from a pre-existing table). Consequently, the theorem implies that no physical theory relying solely on a combination of deterministic laws and pre-existing randomness can fully account for the observed outcomes of quantum measurements. Conway and Kochen's paper was published in Foundations of Physics in 2006. In 2009, the authors published a stronger version of the theorem in the Notices of the American Mathematical Society. Later, in 2017, Kochen elaborated some details, and in 2022 he came up with a simpler and more general proof for the theorem, with the new proof invariant and no longer depending on Lorentz frames.

== Axioms ==
The proof of the theorem as originally formulated relies on three axioms, which Conway and Kochen call "fin", "spin", and "twin". The spin and twin axioms can be verified experimentally.

1. Fin: There is a maximal speed for propagation of information (not necessarily the speed of light). This assumption rests upon causality.
2. Spin: The squared spin component of certain elementary particles of spin one, taken in three orthogonal directions, will be a permutation of (1, 1, 0).
3. Twin: It is possible to "entangle" two elementary particles and separate them by a significant distance, so that they have the same squared spin results if measured in parallel directions. This is a consequence of quantum entanglement, but full entanglement is not necessary for the twin axiom to hold (entanglement is sufficient but not necessary).

It isn't clear why the caveat of a maximal speed of transmission isn't "necessarily the speed of light". That's because there can only be one universal speed, or the powerfully proven Lorentz transformations cannot be even approximately true. And the speed of light has to be that universally determined speed; that's because it is the ratio between the two electromagnetic forces – the electrical and the magnetic – otherwise the laws of nature (in particular, the reality that gives our minds the ability to think) would be impossible.

In their later 2009 paper, "The Strong Free Will Theorem", Conway and Kochen replace the Fin axiom by a weaker one called Min, thereby strengthening the theorem. The Min axiom asserts only that two experimenters separated in a space-like way can make choices of measurements independently of each other. In particular, it is not postulated that the speed of transfer of all information is subject to an upper limit, but only of the particular information about choices of measurements. In 2017, Kochen argued that Min could be replaced by Lin – experimentally testable Lorentz covariance.

== The theorem ==
The free will theorem states:

Given the axioms, if the choice about what measurement to take is not a function of the information accessible to the experimenters (free will assumption), then the results of the measurements cannot be determined by anything previous to the experiments.

That is an "outcome open" theorem:

If the outcome of an experiment was open, then one or two of the experimenters might have acted under free will.

Since the theorem applies to any arbitrary physical theory consistent with the axioms, it would not even be possible to place the information into the universe's past in an ad hoc way. The argument proceeds from the Kochen–Specker theorem, which shows that the result of any individual measurement of spin was not fixed independently of the choice of measurements. As stated by Cator and Landsman regarding hidden-variable theories: "There has been a similar tension between the idea that the hidden variables (in the pertinent causal past) should on the one hand include all ontological information relevant to the experiment, but on the other hand should leave the experimenters free to choose any settings they like." Rephrasing one more time: The experimenters themselves would be bound by the same restraining hidden variables, so the premise of the experimenters making an arbitrary choice would be false, and hence a contradiction. So either there is free will, or the phrasing of the axiom is inadequate. But the phrasing of the axiom appears to be as representative as any.

== Reception ==
According to Cator and Landsman, Conway and Kochen prove that "determinism is incompatible with a number of a priori desirable assumptions". Cator and Landsman compare the Min assumption to the locality assumption in Bell's theorem and conclude in the strong free will theorem's favor that it "uses fewer assumptions than Bell’s 1964 theorem, as no appeal to probability theory is made". The philosopher David Hodgson supports this theorem as showing quite conclusively that "science does not support determinism": that quantum mechanics proves that particles do indeed behave in a way that is not a function of the past. Critics, however, argue that the theorem applies only to deterministic, and not even to stochastic, models.

== See also ==
- Bell's inequalities
- Compatibilism
- Contextualism
- Counterfactual definiteness
- Einstein–Podolsky–Rosen paradox
- Libertarianism (metaphysics)
- No-communication theorem
- Principle of locality
- Superdeterminism
- Quantum mind
- Orchestrated objective reduction
