= Bloch sphere =

Representation of a quantum mechanical system

Bloch Sphere representation

In quantum mechanics and computing, the Bloch sphere is a geometrical representation of the pure state space of a two-level quantum mechanical system (qubit), named after the physicist Felix Bloch.

Mathematically each quantum mechanical system is associated with a separable complex Hilbert space $H$. A pure state of a quantum system is represented by a non-zero vector $\psi$ in $H$. The vectors $\psi$ and $\lambda \psi$ (with $\lambda$ a non-zero complex number) represent the same state. A system with n mutually orthogonal quantum states can be described by a Hilbert space of dimension n. Pure states can be represented as equivalence classes, or, rays in a projective Hilbert space $\mathbf{P}(H_{n})=\mathbb{C}\mathbf{P}^{n-1}$. For a two-dimensional Hilbert space, the space of all such states is the complex projective line $\mathbb{C}\mathbf{P}^1.$ This is the Bloch sphere, which can be mapped to the Riemann sphere.

The Bloch sphere is a unit 2-sphere, with antipodal points corresponding to a pair of mutually orthogonal state vectors. The north and south poles of the Bloch sphere are typically chosen to correspond to the standard basis vectors $|0\rangle$ and $|1\rangle$, respectively, which in turn might correspond e.g. to the spin-up and spin-down states of an electron. This choice is arbitrary, however. The points on the surface of the sphere correspond to the pure states of the system, whereas the interior points correspond to the mixed states. The Bloch sphere may be generalized to an n-level quantum system, but then the visualization is less useful.

The natural metric on the Bloch sphere is the Fubini–Study metric. The mapping from the unit 3-sphere in the two-dimensional state space $\mathbb{C}^2$ to the Bloch sphere is the Hopf fibration, with each ray of spinors mapping to one point on the Bloch sphere.

== Definition ==
Given an orthonormal basis, any pure state $|\psi\rangle$ of a two-level quantum system can be written as a superposition of the basis vectors $|0\rangle$ and $|1\rangle$, where the coefficient of (or contribution from) each of the two basis vectors is a complex number. This means that the state is described by four real numbers. However, only the relative phase between the coefficients of the two basis vectors has any physical meaning (the phase of the quantum system is not directly measurable), so that there is redundancy in this description. The coefficient of $|0\rangle$ can therefore be taken to be real and non-negative. This allows the state to be described by only three real numbers, giving rise to the three dimensions of the Bloch sphere.

In addition, the state is normalized, so that the total probability is one:

$\langle\psi | \psi\rangle = 1$, or equivalently ${\left\||\psi\rangle \right\|\,}^2 = 1$.

With this constraint, $|\psi\rangle$ can be written as

$|\psi\rangle = \cos\left(\theta /2\right) |0 \rangle \, + \, e^{i\phi} \sin\left(\theta /2\right) |1\rangle = \cos\left(\theta /2\right) |0 \rangle \, + \, (\cos\phi + i\sin\phi) \, \sin\left(\theta /2\right) |1\rangle$, where $0 \leq \theta \leq \pi$ and $0 \leq \phi < 2 \pi$.

The point represented by $\theta$ and $\phi$ is always unique, even though the value of $\phi$ is not unique when $|\psi\rangle$ is one of the basis states $|0\rangle$ or $|1\rangle$ (see Bra–ket notation).

The parameters $\theta\,$ and $\phi\,$, re-interpreted in spherical coordinates as respectively the colatitude with respect to the z-axis and the longitude with respect to the x-axis, specify a point

$$\vec{a} = (\sin\theta \cos\phi,\; \sin\theta \sin\phi,\; \cos\theta) = (u, v, w)$$

on the unit sphere in $\mathbb{R}^3$.

For mixed states, one considers the density operator. Any two-dimensional density operator ρ can be expanded using the identity I and the Hermitian, traceless Pauli matrices $\vec{\sigma}$,

$$\begin{align}
\rho &= \frac{1}{2}\left(I + \vec{a} \cdot \vec{\sigma}\right) \\
&= \frac{1}{2}\begin{pmatrix}
1 & 0 \\
0 & 1
\end{pmatrix} +
\frac{a_x}{2}\begin{pmatrix}
0 & 1 \\
1 & 0
\end{pmatrix} +
\frac{a_y}{2}\begin{pmatrix}
0 & -i \\
i &  0
\end{pmatrix} +
\frac{a_z}{2}\begin{pmatrix}
1 &  0 \\
0 & -1
\end{pmatrix} \\
&= \frac{1}{2}\begin{pmatrix}
1 +  a_z & a_x - ia_y \\
a_x + ia_y &   1 -  a_z
\end{pmatrix}
\end{align}$$,

where $\vec{a} \in \mathbb{R}^3$ is called the Bloch vector.

It is this vector that indicates the point within the sphere that corresponds to a given mixed state. Specifically, as a basic feature of the Pauli vector, the eigenvalues of ρ are $\frac{1}{2}\left(1 \pm |\vec{a}|\right)$. Density operators must be positive-semidefinite, so it follows that $\left|\vec{a}\right| \le 1$.

For pure states, one then has

$$\operatorname{tr}\left(\rho^2\right) = \frac{1}{2}\left(1 + \left|\vec{a}\right|^2 \right) = 1 \quad \Leftrightarrow \quad \left|\vec{a}\right| = 1  ~,$$

in agreement with the above.

As a consequence, the surface of the Bloch sphere represents all the pure states of a two-dimensional quantum system, whereas the interior corresponds to all the mixed states.

== u, v, w representation ==
The Bloch vector $\vec{a} = (u,v,w)$ can be represented in the following basis, with reference to the density operator $\rho$:

$$u = \rho_{10} + \rho_{01} = 2 \operatorname{Re}(\rho_{01})$$
$$v = i(\rho_{01} - \rho_{10}) = 2 \operatorname{Im}(\rho_{10})$$
$$w = \rho_{00} - \rho_{11}$$

where

$$\rho =
\begin{pmatrix} \rho_{00} & \rho_{01} \\ \rho_{10} & \rho_{11} \end{pmatrix} =
\frac{1}{2}\begin{pmatrix} 1+w & u-iv \\ u+iv & 1-w \end{pmatrix}.$$

This basis is often used in laser theory, where $w$ is known as the population inversion. In this basis, the values $u, v, w$ are the expectations of the three Pauli matrices $X, Y, Z$, allowing one to identify the three coordinates with x y and z axes.

== Pure states ==
For an n-level quantum system with Hilbert space H_{n}, the pure states are the rays of H_{n}, i.e. the points of the complex projective space $\mathbb{C}\mathbf{P}^{n-1}$. The unitary group U(n) acts transitively on the pure states, and the isotropy group of any given state is isomorphic to U(n − 1) × U(1): a unitary operator that leaves the state invariant can only multiply it by a phase, and it acts as an arbitrary unitary on the orthogonal complement. The pure state space can therefore be identified with the compact coset space

$$\operatorname{U}(n)/\left(\operatorname{U}(n-1)\times\operatorname{U}(1)\right).$$

Since U(n) has real dimension n^{2}, the pure state space has real dimension $n^2-\left((n-1)^2+1\right)=2n-2$. For n = 2 this is the two-dimensional Bloch sphere; for an m-qubit quantum register, with n = 2^{m}, the dimension is 2^{m+1} − 2.

=== Plotting pure two-spinor states through stereographic projection ===
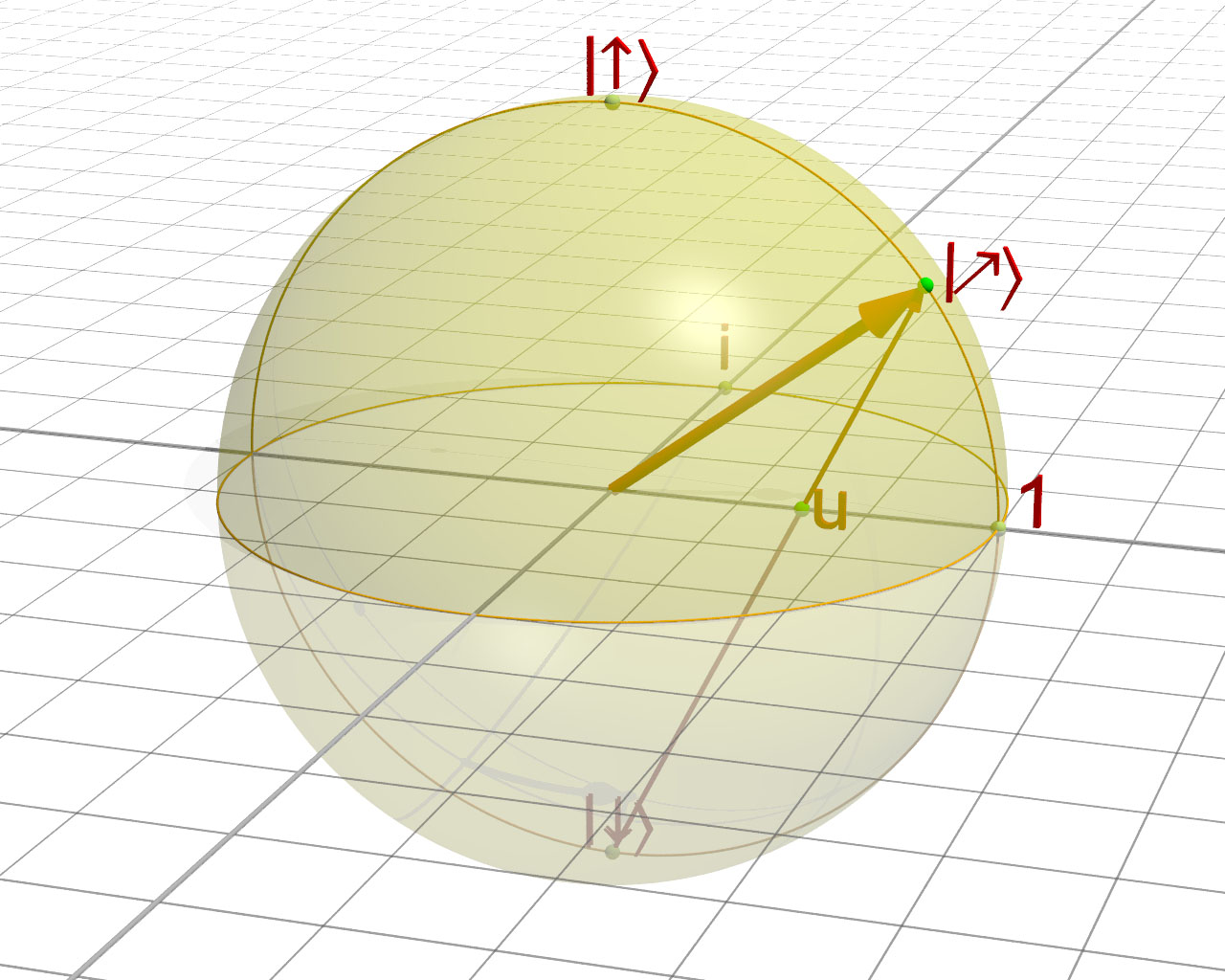
Bloch sphere centered at the origin of $\mathbb{R}^3$. A pair of points on it, $\left|\uparrow\right\rangle$ and $\left|\downarrow\right\rangle$ have been chosen as a basis. Mathematically they are orthogonal even though graphically the angle between them is π. In $\mathbb{R}^3$ those points have coordinates (0,0,1) and (0,0,−1). An arbitrary spinor $\left|\nearrow\right\rangle$ on the Bloch sphere is representable as a unique linear combination of the two basis spinors, with coefficients being a pair of complex numbers; call them α and β. Let their ratio be $u = {\beta \over \alpha}$, which is also a complex number $u_x + i u_y$. Consider the plane z = 0, the equatorial plane of the sphere, as it were, to be a complex plane and that the point u is plotted on it as $(u_x, u_y, 0)$. Project point u stereographically onto the Bloch sphere away from the South Pole — as it were — (0,0,−1). The projection is onto a point marked on the sphere as $\left|\nearrow\right\rangle$.

Mathematically the Bloch sphere for a two-spinor state can be mapped to a Riemann sphere $\mathbb{C}\mathbf{P}^1$, i.e., the projective Hilbert space $\mathbf{P}(H_2)$ with the 2-dimensional complex Hilbert space $H_2$ a representation space of SO(3). Given a pure state

$$\alpha \left|\uparrow \right\rangle + \beta \left|\downarrow \right\rangle = \left|\nearrow \right\rangle$$

where $\alpha$ and $\beta$ are complex numbers which are normalized so that

$$|\alpha|^2 + |\beta|^2 = \alpha^* \alpha + \beta^* \beta = 1$$

and such that $\langle\downarrow | \uparrow\rangle = 0$ and $\langle\downarrow | \downarrow\rangle = \langle\uparrow | \uparrow\rangle = 1$, i.e., such that $\left|\uparrow\right\rangle$ and $\left|\downarrow\right\rangle$ form a basis and have diametrically opposite representations on the Bloch sphere, then let

$$u = {\beta \over \alpha} = {\alpha^* \beta \over \alpha^* \alpha} = {\alpha^* \beta \over |\alpha|^2} = u_x + i u_y$$

be their ratio.

If the Bloch sphere is thought of as being embedded in $\mathbb{R}^3$ with its center at the origin and with radius one, then the plane z = 0 (which intersects the Bloch sphere at a great circle; the sphere's equator, as it were) can be thought of as an Argand diagram. Plot point u in this plane — so that in $\mathbb{R}^3$ it has coordinates $(u_x, u_y, 0)$.

Draw a straight line through u and through the point on the sphere that represents $\left|\downarrow\right\rangle$. (Let (0,0,1) represent $\left|\uparrow\right\rangle$ and (0,0,−1) represent $\left|\downarrow\right\rangle$.) This line intersects the sphere at another point besides $\left|\downarrow\right\rangle$. (The only exception is when $u = \infty$, i.e., when $\alpha = 0$ and $\beta \ne 0$.) Call this point P. Point u on the plane z = 0 is the stereographic projection of point P on the Bloch sphere. The vector with tail at the origin and tip at P is the direction in 3D space corresponding to the spinor $\left|\nearrow\right\rangle$. The coordinates of P are

$$P_x = {2 u_x \over 1 + u_x^2 + u_y^2},$$
$$P_y = {2 u_y \over 1 + u_x^2 + u_y^2},$$
$$P_z = {1 - u_x^2 - u_y^2 \over 1 + u_x^2 + u_y^2}.$$

== Cylindrical coordinates and Born probabilities ==
With $z = \cos\theta$, the probability of finding the state $|0\rangle$ in a measurement in the standard basis depends linearly on the height: $|\langle 0|\psi\rangle|^2 = \cos^2\tfrac{\theta}{2} = \tfrac{1+z}{2}$. By Archimedes' hat-box theorem, the projection of the sphere onto the circumscribed cylinder preserves area; in the coordinates $(z,\phi)$ the area element is simply $\mathrm{d}z\,\mathrm{d}\phi$. If pure states are distributed uniformly over the Bloch sphere, $z$ is therefore uniformly distributed on $[-1,1]$, and so is the Born probability on $[0,1]$. More generally, uniformly distributed pure states in $\mathbb{C}^d$ induce a uniform distribution of measurement probabilities on the probability simplex.

Topologically, the sphere arises from the cylinder $S^1\times[-1,1]$ by collapsing each of the two boundary circles $z=\pm 1$ to a point; it is the suspension of the circle, with the two poles as suspension points. At the poles the angle $\phi$ is therefore undefined. Unlike the sphere, the cylinder is flat; Archimedes' map preserves area but not lengths.

The height $z$ is first of all a coordinate of the state: it is the expectation value $\langle\sigma_z\rangle$ of the Pauli matrix and is uniquely fixed by the state; the Born probability $\tfrac{1+z}{2}$ is a quantity derived from it. For a single qubit, the individual measurement outcome can also be described deterministically. John Stewart Bell and Simon Kochen and Ernst Specker gave hidden-variable models in which every outcome is fixed by the state together with an additional parameter, and the Born probability arises only from averaging over that parameter. The Kochen–Specker theorem excludes non-contextual models of this kind only from Hilbert-space dimension 3 onwards. Diederik Aerts constructed a model directly on the Bloch sphere: the state point is projected orthogonally onto the measurement axis, which breaks at a uniformly distributed location; the probability $\tfrac{1+z}{2}$ then follows from the uniform distribution along the axis, i.e. from the same linear height as in Archimedes' argument. For systems of several qubits, Bell's theorem rules out local models of this kind, but not non-local deterministic ones: de Broglie–Bohm theory is deterministic and reproduces the predictions of quantum mechanics for any number of qubits, so that experiments cannot distinguish between a deterministic and an indeterministic description. The Bloch-sphere representation is thus interpretation-neutral: whether the height $z$ is read as a probability or as a deterministically fixed quantity is decided not by the representation but by the underlying interpretation of quantum mechanics.

== Density operators ==
Formulations of quantum mechanics in terms of pure states are adequate for isolated systems; in general quantum mechanical systems need to be described in terms of density operators. The Bloch sphere parametrizes not only pure states but mixed states for 2-level systems. The density operator describing the mixed-state of a 2-level quantum system (qubit) corresponds to a point inside the Bloch sphere with the following coordinates:

$$\left( \sum p_i x_i,  \sum p_i y_i,  \sum p_i z_i \right),$$

where $p_i$ is the probability of the individual states within the ensemble and $x_i, y_i, z_i$ are the coordinates of the individual states (on the surface of Bloch sphere). The set of all points on and inside the Bloch sphere is known as the Bloch ball.

For higher dimensions the description of mixed states is more complicated, because the unitary group does not act transitively on density operators, and its orbits depend on the spectrum. If a density operator has distinct eigenvalues μ_{1}, ..., μ_{k} with multiplicities n_{1}, ..., n_{k}, the unitary operators commuting with it form a group isomorphic to U(n_{1}) × ⋯ × U(n_{k}), and its orbit is the flag manifold

$\operatorname{U}(n)/\left(\operatorname{U}(n_1) \times \cdots \times \operatorname{U}(n_k)\right).$

It is possible to generalize the construction of the Bloch ball to dimensions larger than 2, but the geometry of such a "Bloch body" is more complicated than that of a ball.

== Rotations ==
An advantage of the Bloch sphere representation is that the unitary evolution of a qubit state is described by rotations of the Bloch sphere. The reason is that the Lie algebra of the group $SU(2)$ of special unitary 2×2 matrices is isomorphic to the Lie algebra of the group $SO(3)$ of three-dimensional rotations.

=== Rotation operators about the Bloch basis ===
The rotations of the Bloch sphere about the Cartesian axes in the Bloch basis are given by

$$\begin{align}
R_x(\theta) &= e^{(-i \theta X/2)} = \cos(\theta /2)I - i\sin(\theta/2)X =
\begin{bmatrix}
\cos \theta/2  & -i \sin \theta/2 \\
-i \sin \theta/2 & \cos \theta/2
\end{bmatrix} \\
R_y(\theta) &= e^{(-i \theta Y/2)} = \cos(\theta /2)I - i\sin(\theta/2)Y =
\begin{bmatrix}
\cos \theta/2  & -\sin \theta/2 \\
\sin \theta/2 & \cos \theta/2
\end{bmatrix} \\
R_z(\theta) &= e^{(-i \theta Z/2)} = \cos(\theta /2)I - i\sin(\theta/2)Z =
\begin{bmatrix}
e^{-i \theta/2}  & 0 \\
0 & e^{i \theta/2}
\end{bmatrix}
\end{align}$$

=== Rotations about a general axis ===
If $\hat{n} = (n_x, n_y, n_z)$ is a real unit vector in three dimensions, the rotation of the Bloch sphere about this axis is given by:

$$R_{\hat{n}}(\theta) = \exp\left(-i\theta\hat{n} \cdot \frac{1}{2}\vec{\sigma}\right)$$

Under relabelling, this expression is identical to the extended Euler formula for pure imaginary quaternions.

$$\mathbf{q} =
e^{\frac{1}{2}\theta(u_x\mathbf{i} + u_y\mathbf{j} + u_z\mathbf{k})} =
\cos \frac{\theta}{2} + (u_x\mathbf{i} + u_y\mathbf{j} + u_z\mathbf{k}) \sin \frac{\theta}{2}$$

=== Derivation of the Bloch rotation generator ===
Following Ballentine, a rotation about a fixed axis is described by a one-parameter family of unitary operators $U(s)$ with $U(0)=I$ and $U(s_1+s_2)=U(s_1)U(s_2)$. To first order, $U(s)=I+s\,\tfrac{dU}{ds}\big|_{s=0}+O(s^2)$, and the unitarity condition $U^\dagger U=I$ requires the derivative at $s=0$ to be anti-Hermitian: $\tfrac{dU}{ds}\big|_{s=0}=iK$ with $K$ Hermitian. The operator $K$ is called the generator of the family, and

$$U(s)=e^{iKs}.$$

For rotations of the Bloch sphere about an axis $\hat{n}$ the generator is $K=\hat{n}\cdot\vec{\sigma}/2$, built from the Pauli matrices, whose eigenvectors correspond to the Bloch axes. With $s=-\theta$ this gives

$$R_{\hat{n}}(\theta)=\exp\left(-i\theta\,\hat{n}\cdot\vec{\sigma}/2\right).$$

See also Rotation operator (quantum mechanics).

== See also ==
- Atomic electron transition
- Versors
- Specific implementations of the Bloch sphere are enumerated under the qubit article.
