= Superdeterminism =

Class of theories in quantum mechanics

In quantum mechanics, superdeterminism is a loophole in Bell's theorem. By postulating that all systems being measured are correlated with the choices of which measurements to make on them, the assumptions of the theorem are no longer fulfilled. A hidden-variable theory which is superdeterministic can thus fulfill Bell's notion of local causality and still violate the inequalities derived from Bell's theorem. This makes it possible to construct a local hidden-variable theory that reproduces the predictions of quantum mechanics, for which a few toy models have been proposed. In addition to being deterministic, superdeterministic models also postulate correlations between the state that is measured and the measurement setting.

== Overview ==
Bell's theorem assumes that the measurements performed at each detector can be chosen independently of each other and of the hidden variables that determine the measurement outcome. This relation is often referred to as measurement independence or statistical independence. In a superdeterministic theory this relation is not fulfilled; the hidden variables are necessarily correlated with the measurement setting. Since the choice of measurements and the hidden variable are predetermined, the results at one detector can depend on which measurement is done at the other without any need for information to travel faster than the speed of light. The assumption of statistical independence is sometimes referred to as the free choice or free will assumption, since its negation implies that human experimentalists are not free to choose which measurement to perform.

It is possible to test restricted versions of superdeterminism that posit that the correlations between the hidden variables and the choice of measurement have been established in the recent past. In general, though, superdeterminism is fundamentally untestable, as the correlations can be postulated to exist since the Big Bang, making the loophole impossible to eliminate.

A hypothetical depiction of superdeterminism in which photons from the distant galaxies Sb and Sc are used to control the orientation of the polarization detectors α and β just prior to the arrival of entangled photons Alice and Bob

In the 1980s, John Stewart Bell discussed superdeterminism in a BBC interview:

There is a way to escape the inference of superluminal speeds and spooky action at a distance. But it involves absolute determinism in the universe, the complete absence of free will. Suppose the world is super-deterministic, with not just inanimate nature running on behind-the-scenes clockwork, but with our behavior, including our belief that we are free to choose to do one experiment rather than another, absolutely predetermined, including the "decision" by the experimenter to carry out one set of measurements rather than another, the difficulty disappears. There is no need for a faster than light signal to tell particle A what measurement has been carried out on particle B, because the universe, including particle A, already "knows" what that measurement, and its outcome, will be.

Although he acknowledged the loophole, he also argued that it was implausible. Even if the measurements performed are chosen by deterministic random number generators, the choices can be assumed to be "effectively free for the purpose at hand," because the machine's choice is altered by a large number of very small effects. It is unlikely for the hidden variable to be sensitive to all of the same small influences that the random number generator was.

Nobel Prize in Physics winner Gerard 't Hooft discussed this loophole with John Bell in the early 1980s:

I raised the question: Suppose that also Alice's and Bob's decisions have to be seen as not coming out of free will, but being determined by everything in the theory. John said, well, you know, that I have to exclude. If it's possible, then what I said doesn't apply. I said, Alice and Bob are making a decision out of a cause. A cause lies in their past and has to be included in the picture".

According to the physicist Anton Zeilinger, if superdeterminism is true, some of its implications would bring into question the value of science itself by destroying falsifiability:

[W]e always implicitly assume the freedom of the experimentalist... This fundamental assumption is essential to doing science. If this were not true, then, I suggest, it would make no sense at all to ask nature questions in an experiment, since then nature could determine what our questions are, and that could guide our questions such that we arrive at a false picture of nature.

Physicists Sabine Hossenfelder and Tim Palmer have argued that superdeterminism "is a promising approach not only to solve the measurement problem, but also to understand the apparent non-locality of quantum physics".

Howard M. Wiseman and Eric Cavalcanti argue that any hypothetical superdeterministic theory "would be about as plausible, and appealing, as belief in ubiquitous alien mind-control".

== Examples ==
The first superdeterministic hidden variables model was put forward by Carl H. Brans in 1988. Other models were proposed in 2010 by Michael Hall, and in 2022 by Donadi and Hossenfelder. Gerard 't Hooft has referred to his cellular automaton model of quantum mechanics as superdeterministic though it has remained unclear whether it fulfills the definition.

Some authors consider retrocausality in quantum mechanics to be an example of superdeterminism, whereas other authors treat the two cases as distinct. No agreed-upon definition for distinguishing them exists.

== See also ==
- Hard determinism
- Necessitarianism
- Laplace's demon
- De Broglie–Bohm theory
- Many-worlds interpretation
- Quantum entanglement
- Free will theorem
