= Local hidden-variable theory =

Interpretation of quantum mechanics

In the interpretation of quantum mechanics, a local hidden-variable theory is a hidden-variable theory that satisfies the principle of locality. These models attempt to account for the probabilistic features of quantum mechanics via the mechanism of underlying but inaccessible variables, with the additional requirement that distant events be statistically independent.

The mathematical implications of a local hidden-variable theory with regard to quantum entanglement were explored by physicist John Stewart Bell, who in 1964 proved that broad classes of local hidden-variable theories cannot reproduce the correlations between measurement outcomes that quantum mechanics predicts, a result since confirmed by a range of detailed Bell test experiments.

== Models ==
=== Single qubit ===
A collection of related theorems, beginning with Bell's proof in 1964, show that quantum mechanics is incompatible with local hidden variables. However, as Bell pointed out, restricted sets of quantum phenomena can be imitated using local hidden-variable models. Bell provided a local hidden-variable model for quantum measurements upon a spin-1/2 particle, or in the terminology of quantum information theory, a single qubit. Bell's model was later simplified by N. David Mermin, and a closely related model was presented by Simon B. Kochen and Ernst Specker. The existence of these models is related to the fact that Gleason's theorem does not apply to the case of a single qubit.

=== Bipartite quantum states ===
Bell also pointed out that up until then, discussions of quantum entanglement focused on cases where the results of measurements upon two particles were either perfectly correlated or perfectly anti-correlated. These special cases can also be explained using local hidden variables.

For separable states of two particles, there is a simple hidden-variable model for any measurements on the two parties. Surprisingly, there are also entangled states for which all von Neumann measurements can be described by a hidden-variable model. Such states are entangled, but do not violate any Bell inequality. The so-called Werner states are a single-parameter family of states that are invariant under any transformation of the type $U \otimes U,$ where $U$ is a unitary matrix. For two qubits, they are noisy singlets given as
$$\varrho = p \vert \psi^- \rangle \langle \psi^-\vert + (1 - p) \frac{\mathbb{I}}{4},$$
where the singlet is defined as $\vert \psi^-\rangle = \tfrac{1}{\sqrt{2}}\left(\vert 01\rangle - \vert 10\rangle\right)$.

Reinhard F. Werner showed that such states allow for a hidden-variable model for $p \leq 1/2$, while they are entangled if $p > 1/3$. The bound for hidden-variable models could be improved until $p = 2/3$. Hidden-variable models have been constructed for Werner states even if positive operator-valued measurements (POVM) are allowed, not only von Neumann measurements. Hidden variable models were also constructed to noisy maximally entangled states, and even extended to arbitrary pure states mixed with white noise. Beside bipartite systems, there are also results for the multipartite case. A hidden-variable model for any von Neumann measurements at the parties has been presented for a three-qubit quantum state.

== Time-dependent variables ==
Previously some new hypotheses were conjectured concerning the role of time in constructing hidden-variables theory. One approach was suggested by K. Hess and W. Philipp and relies upon possible consequences of time dependencies of hidden variables; this hypothesis has been criticized by Richard D. Gill, Gregor Weihs, Anton Zeilinger and Marek Żukowski, as well as D. M. Appleby.

== See also ==
- EPR paradox
- Bohr–Einstein debates
