= Hidden-variable theory =

Type of quantum mechanics theory

In physics, a hidden-variable theory is a deterministic model which seeks to explain the probabilistic nature of quantum mechanics by introducing additional, possibly inaccessible, variables.

The mathematical formulation of quantum mechanics assumes that the state of a system prior to measurement is indeterminate; quantitative bounds on this indeterminacy are expressed by the Heisenberg uncertainty principle. Most hidden-variable theories are attempts to avoid this indeterminacy, but possibly at the expense of requiring that nonlocal interactions be allowed. One notable, nonlocal hidden-variable theory is the de Broglie–Bohm theory.

In their 1935 EPR paper, Albert Einstein, Boris Podolsky, and Nathan Rosen argued that quantum entanglement might imply that quantum mechanics is an incomplete description of reality. John Stewart Bell in 1964, in his eponymous theorem proved that correlations between particles under any local hidden variable theory must obey certain constraints. Subsequently, Bell test experiments have demonstrated broad violation of these constraints, ruling out such theories. Bell's theorem, however, does not rule out the possibility of nonlocal hidden variable theories like the de Broglie-Bohm theory.

== Motivation ==
Macroscopic physics requires classical mechanics which allows accurate predictions of mechanical motion with reproducible, high precision. Quantum phenomena require quantum mechanics, which allows accurate predictions of statistical averages only. If quantum states had hidden-variables awaiting ingenious new measurement technologies, then arbitrarily high precision results might be possible.

This classical mechanics description would eliminate unsettling characteristics of quantum theory like the uncertainty principle. More fundamentally however, a successful model of quantum phenomena with hidden variables implies quantum entities with intrinsic values independent of measurements. Existing quantum mechanics asserts that state properties can only be known after a measurement. As N. David Mermin puts it:

It is a fundamental quantum doctrine that a measurement does not, in general, reveal a pre-existing value of the measured property. On the contrary, the outcome of a measurement is brought into being by the act of measurement itself...

In other words, whereas a hidden-variable theory would imply intrinsic particle properties, in quantum mechanics an electron has no definite position and velocity to even be revealed.

== History ==
=== "God does not play dice" ===
In June 1926, Max Born published a paper, in which he was the first to clearly enunciate the probabilistic interpretation of the quantum wave function, which had been introduced by Erwin Schrödinger earlier in the year. Born concluded the paper as follows:

Here the whole problem of determinism comes up. From the standpoint of our quantum mechanics there is no quantity which in any individual case causally fixes the consequence of the collision; but also experimentally we have so far no reason to believe that there are some inner properties of the atom which conditions a definite outcome for the collision. Ought we to hope later to discover such properties ... and determine them in individual cases? Or ought we to believe that the agreement of theory and experiment—as to the impossibility of prescribing conditions for a causal evolution—is a pre-established harmony founded on the nonexistence of such conditions? I myself am inclined to give up determinism in the world of atoms. But that is a philosophical question for which physical arguments alone are not decisive.

Born's interpretation of the wave function was criticized by Schrödinger, who had previously attempted to interpret it in real physical terms, but Albert Einstein's response became one of the earliest and most famous assertions that quantum mechanics is incomplete:

Quantum mechanics is very worthy of respect. But an inner voice tells me this is not the genuine article after all. The theory delivers much but it hardly brings us closer to the Old One's secret. In any event, I am convinced that He is not playing dice.

Niels Bohr reportedly replied to Einstein's later expression of this sentiment by advising him to "stop telling God what to do."

=== Early attempts at hidden-variable theories ===
Shortly after making his famous "God does not play dice" comment, Einstein attempted to formulate a deterministic counter proposal to quantum mechanics, presenting a paper at a meeting of the Academy of Sciences in Berlin, on 5 May 1927, titled "Bestimmt Schrödinger's Wellenmechanik die Bewegung eines Systems vollständig oder nur im Sinne der Statistik?" ("Does Schrödinger's wave mechanics determine the motion of a system completely or only in the statistical sense?"). However, as the paper was being prepared for publication in the academy's journal, Einstein decided to withdraw it, possibly because he discovered that, contrary to his intention, his use of Schrödinger's field to guide localized particles allowed just the kind of non-local influences he intended to avoid.

At the Fifth Solvay Congress, held in Belgium in October 1927 and attended by all the major theoretical physicists of the era, Louis de Broglie presented his own version of a deterministic hidden-variable theory, apparently unaware of Einstein's aborted attempt earlier in the year. In his theory, every particle had an associated, hidden "pilot wave" which served to guide its trajectory through space. The theory was subject to criticism at the Congress, particularly by Wolfgang Pauli, which de Broglie did not adequately answer; de Broglie abandoned the theory shortly thereafter.

=== Declaration of completeness of quantum mechanics, and the Bohr–Einstein debates ===
Also at the Fifth Solvay Congress, Max Born and Werner Heisenberg made a presentation summarizing the recent tremendous theoretical development of quantum mechanics. At the conclusion of the presentation, they declared:

[W]hile we consider ... a quantum mechanical treatment of the electromagnetic field ... as not yet finished, we consider quantum mechanics to be a closed theory, whose fundamental physical and mathematical assumptions are no longer susceptible of any modification... On the question of the 'validity of the law of causality' we have this opinion: as long as one takes into account only experiments that lie in the domain of our currently acquired physical and quantum mechanical experience, the assumption of indeterminism in principle, here taken as fundamental, agrees with experience.

Although there is no record of Einstein responding to Born and Heisenberg during the technical sessions of the Fifth Solvay Congress, he did challenge the completeness of quantum mechanics at various times. In his tribute article for Born's retirement he discussed the quantum representation of a macroscopic ball bouncing elastically between rigid barriers. He argues that such a quantum representation does not represent a specific ball, but "time ensemble of systems". As such the representation is correct, but incomplete because it does not represent the real individual macroscopic case. Einstein considered quantum mechanics incomplete "because the state function, in general, does not even describe the individual event/system".

=== Von Neumann's proof ===
John von Neumann in his 1932 book Mathematical Foundations of Quantum Mechanics had presented a proof that there could be no "hidden parameters" in quantum mechanics. The validity of von Neumann's proof was questioned by Grete Hermann in 1935, who found a flaw in the proof. The critical issue concerned averages over ensembles. Von Neumann assumed that a relation between the expected values of different observable quantities holds for each possible value of the "hidden parameters", rather than only for a statistical average over them. However Hermann's work went mostly unnoticed until its rediscovery by John Stewart Bell more than 30 years later.

The validity and definitiveness of von Neumann's proof were also questioned by Hans Reichenbach, and possibly in conversation though not in print by Albert Einstein. Reportedly, in a conversation circa 1938 with his assistants Peter Bergmann and Valentine Bargmann, Einstein pulled von Neumann's book off his shelf, pointed to the same assumption critiqued by Hermann and Bell, and asked why one should believe in it. Simon Kochen and Ernst Specker rejected von Neumann's key assumption as early as 1961, but did not publish a criticism of it until 1967.

=== EPR paradox ===
Einstein argued that quantum mechanics could not be a complete theory of physical reality. He wrote,

Consider a mechanical system consisting of two partial systems A and B which interact with each other only during a limited time. Let the ψ function [i.e., wavefunction] before their interaction be given. Then the Schrödinger equation will furnish the ψ function after the interaction has taken place. Let us now determine the physical state of the partial system A as completely as possible by measurements. Then quantum mechanics allows us to determine the ψ function of the partial system B from the measurements made, and from the ψ function of the total system. This determination, however, gives a result which depends upon which of the physical quantities (observables) of A have been measured (for instance, coordinates or momenta). Since there can be only one physical state of B after the interaction which cannot reasonably be considered to depend on the particular measurement we perform on the system A separated from B it may be concluded that the ψ function is not unambiguously coordinated to the physical state. This coordination of several ψ functions to the same physical state of system B shows again that the ψ function cannot be interpreted as a (complete) description of a physical state of a single system.

Together with Boris Podolsky and Nathan Rosen, Einstein published a paper that gave a related but distinct argument against the completeness of quantum mechanics. They proposed a thought experiment involving a pair of particles prepared in what would later become known as an entangled state. Einstein, Podolsky, and Rosen pointed out that, in this state, if the position of the first particle were measured, the result of measuring the position of the second particle could be predicted. If instead the momentum of the first particle were measured, then the result of measuring the momentum of the second particle could be predicted. They argued that no action taken on the first particle could instantaneously affect the other, since this would involve information being transmitted faster than light, which is impossible according to the theory of relativity. They invoked a principle, later known as the "EPR criterion of reality", positing that: "If, without in any way disturbing a system, we can predict with certainty (i.e., with probability equal to unity) the value of a physical quantity, then there exists an element of reality corresponding to that quantity." From this, they inferred that the second particle must have a definite value of both position and of momentum prior to either quantity being measured. But quantum mechanics considers these two observables incompatible and thus does not associate simultaneous values for both to any system. Einstein, Podolsky, and Rosen therefore concluded that quantum theory does not provide a complete description of reality.

Bohr answered the Einstein–Podolsky–Rosen challenge as follows:

[The argument of] Einstein, Podolsky and Rosen contains an ambiguity as regards the meaning of the expression "without in any way disturbing a system." ... [E]ven at this stage [i.e., the measurement of, for example, a particle that is part of an entangled pair], there is essentially the question of an influence on the very conditions which define the possible types of predictions regarding the future behavior of the system. Since these conditions constitute an inherent element of the description of any phenomenon to which the term "physical reality" can be properly attached, we see that the argumentation of the mentioned authors does not justify their conclusion that quantum-mechanical description is essentially incomplete."

Bohr is here choosing to define a "physical reality" as limited to a phenomenon that is immediately observable by an arbitrarily chosen and explicitly specified technique, using his own special definition of the term 'phenomenon'. He wrote in 1948:

As a more appropriate way of expression, one may strongly advocate limitation of the use of the word phenomenon to refer exclusively to observations obtained under specified circumstances, including an account of the whole experiment.

This was, of course, in conflict with the EPR criterion of reality.

=== Bell's theorem ===
In 1964, John Stewart Bell showed through his famous theorem that if local hidden variables exist, certain experiments could be performed involving quantum entanglement where the result would satisfy a Bell inequality. If, on the other hand, statistical correlations resulting from quantum entanglement could not be explained by local hidden variables, the Bell inequality would be violated. Another no-go theorem concerning hidden-variable theories is the Kochen–Specker theorem.

Physicists such as Alain Aspect and Paul Kwiat have performed experiments that have found violations of these inequalities up to 242 standard deviations. This rules out local hidden-variable theories, but does not rule out non-local ones. Theoretically, there could be experimental problems that affect the validity of the experimental findings.

Gerard 't Hooft has disputed the validity of Bell's theorem on the basis of the superdeterminism loophole and proposed some ideas to construct local deterministic models.

The many-worlds interpretation loophole allows the local, realist theory to violate Bell inequalities due to there being more than one experimental outcome in the interpretation.

== Bohm's non-local hidden-variable theory ==
In 1952, David Bohm proposed a hidden variable theory. Bohm unknowingly rediscovered (and extended) the idea that Louis de Broglie's pilot wave theory had proposed in 1927 (and abandoned) – hence this theory is commonly called "de Broglie-Bohm theory". Assuming the validity of Bell's theorem, any deterministic hidden-variable theory that is consistent with quantum mechanics would have to be non-local, maintaining the existence of instantaneous or faster-than-light relations (correlations) between physically separated entities.

Bohm posited both the quantum particle, e.g. an electron, and a 'guiding wave' that governs its motion. Thus, in this theory electrons are quite clearly particles. When a double-slit experiment is performed, the electron goes through either one of the slits. Also, the slit passed through is not random but is governed by the pilot wave, resulting in the wave pattern that is observed. The precise positions and trajectories of the particle are not knowable or defined in the standard quantum formalism and constitute the "hidden" variable of the interpretation.

In Bohm's interpretation, the (non-local) quantum potential constitutes an implicate order which organizes a particle, and which may itself be the result of yet a further implicate order: a superimplicate order which organizes a field. Nowadays Bohm's theory is considered to be one of many interpretations of quantum mechanics. Some consider it the simplest theory to explain quantum phenomena. Nevertheless, it is a hidden-variable theory, and necessarily so. The major reference for Bohm's theory today is his book with Basil Hiley, published posthumously.

A possible weakness of Bohm's theory is that some (including Einstein, Pauli, and Heisenberg) feel that it looks contrived. (Indeed, Bohm thought this of his original formulation of the theory.) Bohm said he considered his theory to be unacceptable as a physical theory due to the guiding wave's existence in an abstract multi-dimensional configuration space, rather than three-dimensional space.

== Hidden-measurement models ==
For a single qubit, deterministic hidden-variable models are easy to construct and are not excluded by any no-go theorem: John Stewart Bell gave such a model for a spin-½ particle in 1966 as a counterexample to von Neumann's proof, and Kochen and Specker gave another in 1967, while showing that no non-contextual model exists in three or more dimensions.

In the hidden-measurement approach introduced by Diederik Aerts in 1986, the hidden variables are located not in the state of the system but in the interaction with the measuring apparatus. In the simplest version, the qubit state is a point on the Bloch sphere that is projected orthogonally onto the measurement axis; an elastic band stretched between the two poles of the axis breaks at a uniformly distributed random point, and the state point is pulled to the pole on its side of the break. The probability of reaching the pole $+1$ is $(1+z)/2$, where $z$ is the coordinate of the state point along the axis, which is exactly the Born rule. Each individual outcome is determined once the breaking point is fixed, so the indeterminism of quantum mechanics is attributed to a lack of knowledge about the measurement interaction rather than about the state. The model was later extended to systems with an arbitrary number of states by means of an extended Bloch representation. Hidden-measurement models are contextual by construction, since the hidden variable belongs to the measurement setting, and are therefore not affected by the Kochen–Specker theorem; for entangled systems they must, like all deterministic models, be nonlocal by Bell's theorem.

== Recent developments ==
In August 2011, Roger Colbeck and Renato Renner published a proof that any extension of quantum mechanical theory, whether using hidden variables or otherwise, cannot provide a more accurate prediction of outcomes, assuming that observers can freely choose the measurement settings. Colbeck and Renner write: "In the present work, we have ... excluded the possibility that any extension of quantum theory (not necessarily in the form of local hidden variables) can help predict the outcomes of any measurement on any quantum state. In this sense, we show the following: under the assumption that measurement settings can be chosen freely, quantum theory really is complete".

In January 2013, Giancarlo Ghirardi and Raffaele Romano described a model which, "under a different free choice assumption [...] violates [the statement by Colbeck and Renner] for almost all states of a bipartite two-level system, in a possibly experimentally testable way".

== See also ==
- Einstein's thought experiments
- Pusey–Barrett–Rudolph theorem
- Spekkens toy model

== Bibliography ==
- Peres, Asher; Zurek, Wojciech (1982). "Is quantum theory universally valid?". American Journal of Physics. 50 (9): 807–810. Bibcode:1982AmJPh..50..807P. doi:10.1119/1.13086.
- Jammer, Max (1985). "The EPR Problem in Its Historical Development". In Lahti, P.; Mittelstaedt, P. (eds.). Symposium on the Foundations of Modern Physics: 50 years of the Einstein–Podolsky–Rosen Gedankenexperiment. Singapore: World Scientific. pp. 129–149.
- Fine, Arthur (1986). The Shaky Game: Einstein Realism and the Quantum Theory. Chicago: University of Chicago Press.
