= Principle of locality =

Physical principle that only immediate surroundings can influence an object

In physics, the principle of locality states that an object is influenced directly only by its immediate surroundings. A theory that includes the principle of locality is said to be a "local theory". This is an alternative to the concept of instantaneous, or "non-local" action at a distance. Locality evolved out of the field theories of classical physics. The idea is that for a cause at one point to have an effect at another point, something in the space between those points must mediate the action. To exert an influence, something, such as a wave or particle, must travel through the space between the two points, carrying the influence.

The special theory of relativity limits the maximum speed at which causal influence can travel to the speed of light, $c$. Therefore, the principle of locality implies that an event at one point cannot cause a truly simultaneous result at another point. An event at point $A$ cannot cause a result at point $B$ in a time less than $T=D/c$, where $D$ is the distance between the points and $c$ is the speed of light in vacuum.

The principle of locality plays a critical role in one of the central results of quantum mechanics. In 1935, Albert Einstein, Boris Podolsky, and Nathan Rosen, with their EPR paradox thought experiment, raised the possibility that quantum mechanics might not be a complete theory. They described two systems physically separated after interacting; this pair would be called entangled in modern terminology. They reasoned that without additions, now called hidden variables, quantum mechanics would predict illogical relationships between the physically separated measurements.

In 1964, John Stewart Bell formulated Bell's theorem, an inequality which, if violated in actual experiments, implies that quantum mechanics violates local causality (referred to as local realism in later work), a result now considered equivalent to precluding local hidden variables. Progressive variations on those Bell test experiments have since shown that quantum mechanics broadly violates Bell's inequalities. According to some interpretations of quantum mechanics, this result implies that some quantum effects violate the principle of locality.

== Pre-quantum mechanics ==
During the 17th century, Newton's principle of universal gravitation was formulated in terms of "action at a distance", thereby violating the principle of locality. Newton himself considered this violation to be absurd:

It is inconceivable that inanimate Matter should, without the Mediation of something else, which is not material, operate upon, and affect other matter without mutual Contact…That Gravity should be innate, inherent and essential to Matter, so that one body may act upon another at a distance thro' a Vacuum, without the Mediation of any thing else, by and through which their Action and Force may be conveyed from one to another, is to me so great an Absurdity that I believe no Man who has in philosophical Matters a competent Faculty of thinking can ever fall into it. Gravity must be caused by an Agent acting constantly according to certain laws; but whether this Agent be material or immaterial, I have left to the Consideration of my readers.

— Isaac Newton, Letters to Bentley, 1692/3

Coulomb's law of electric forces was initially also formulated as instantaneous action at a distance, but in 1880, James Clerk Maxwell showed that field equations – which obey locality – predict all of the phenomena of electromagnetism. These equations show that electromagnetic forces propagate at the speed of light.

In 1905, Albert Einstein's special theory of relativity postulated that no matter or energy can travel faster than the speed of light, and Einstein thereby sought to reformulate physics in a way that obeyed the principle of locality. He later succeeded in producing an alternative theory of gravitation, general relativity, which obeys the principle of locality.

However, a different challenge to the principle of locality developed subsequently from the theory of quantum mechanics, which Einstein himself had helped to create.

== Models for locality ==
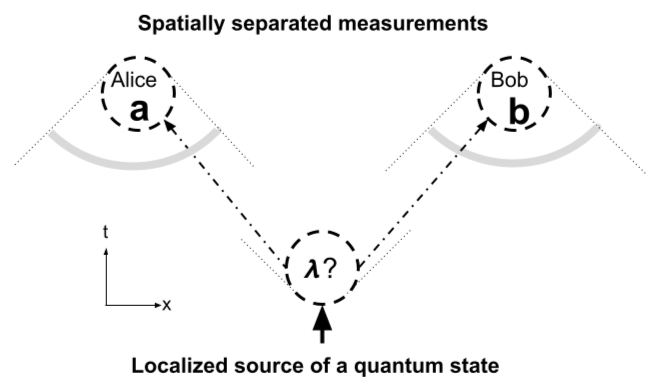
Diagram for locality in quantum mechanics

Simple spacetime diagrams can help clarify the issues related to locality. A way to describe the issues of locality suitable for discussion of quantum mechanics is illustrated in the diagram. A particle is created in one location, then split and measured in two other, spatially separated, locations. The two measurements are named for Alice and Bob. Alice performs measurements (A) and gets a result $\mathbf{a}$. Bob performs ($B$) and gets result $\mathbf{b}$. The experiment is repeated many times and the results are compared.

=== Alice and Bob in spacetime ===
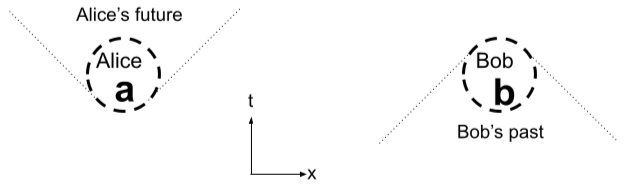
Alice and Bob in spacetime diagram

A spacetime diagram has a time coordinate going vertical and a space coordinate going horizontal. Alice, in a local region on the left, can affect events only in a cone extending in the future as shown; the finite speed of light prevents her from affecting other areas including Bob's location in this case. Similarly, we can use the diagram to reason that Bob's local circumstances cannot be altered by Alice at the same time: all events that cause an effect on Bob are in the cone below his location on the diagram. Dashed lines around Alice show her valid future locations; dashed lines around Bob show events that could have caused his present circumstance. When Alice measures quantum states in her location she gets the results labeled $\mathbf{a}$; similarly Bob gets $\mathbf{b}$. Models of locality attempt to explain the statistical relationship between these measured values.

=== Action at a distance ===
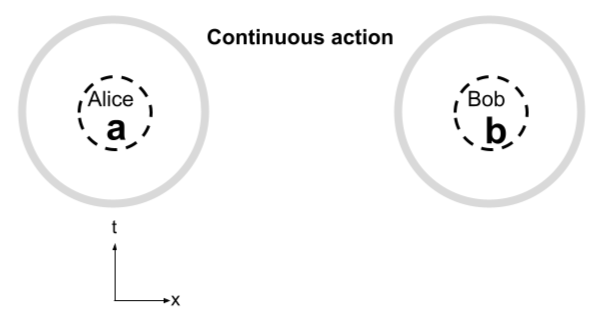
Action at a distance

The simplest locality model is no locality: instantaneous action at a distance with no limits for relativity. The locality model for action at a distance is called continuous action. The gray area (a circle here) is a mathematical concept called a "screen". Any path from a location through the screen becomes part of the physical model at that location. The gray ring indicates events from all parts of space and time can affect the probability measured by Alice or Bob. So in the case of continuous action, events at all times and places affect Alice's and Bob's model. This simple model is highly successful for solar planetary dynamics with Newtonian gravity and in electrostatics, cases where relativistic effects are insignificant.

=== No future-input dependence ===
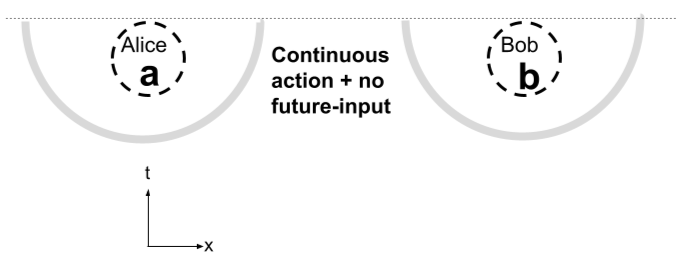
No future-input dependence

Many locality models explicitly or implicitly ignore the possible effect of future events. The spacetime diagram at the right shows the effect of such a restriction when combined with continuous action. Inputs from the future (above the dashed line) are no longer considered part of Alice's or Bob's model. Comparing this diagram with the one for continuous action makes it clear that these are not the same locality model. Common sense arguments about the future not affecting the present are reasonable criteria but such assumptions alter the mathematical character of the models.

=== Bell's local causality ===
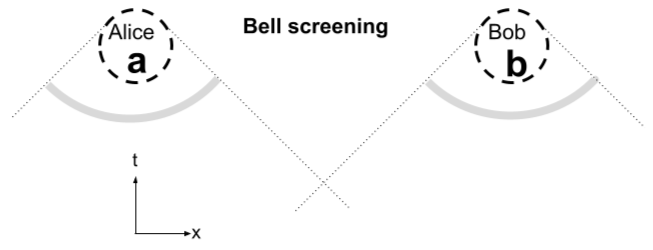
Bell's local causality

John Stewart Bell when discussing his 1975 version of Bell's theorem used the screening model shown at the right. Events in the common past of Alice and Bob are part of the model used in calculating probabilities for Alice and for Bob as indicated the way the screen absorbs those events. However events at Bob's location during Alice measurement and events in the future are excluded. Bell called this assumption local causality, but with the diagram we can reason about the meaning of the assumption without getting tripped up by other meanings of local combined with other meanings of causal. Dash lines show relativistically valid regions in the past of Alice or Bob. The gray arc is the assumed Bell "screen".

== Quantum mechanics ==
The relative positions of our few, easily distinguishable planets (for example) can be seen directly: understanding and measuring their relative location poses only technical issues. The submicroscopic world on the other hand is known only by measurements that average over many seemingly random ("statistical" or "probabilistic") events and measurements can show either particle-like or wave-like results depending on their design. This world is governed by quantum mechanics. The concepts of locality are more complex and they are described in the language of probability and correlation.

In the 1935 Einstein–Podolsky–Rosen paradox paper (EPR paper), Albert Einstein, Boris Podolsky and Nathan Rosen imagined such an experiment. They observed that quantum mechanics predicts what is now known as quantum entanglement and examined its consequences. In their view, the classical principle of locality implied that "no real change can take place" at Bob's site as a result of whatever measurements Alice was doing. Since quantum mechanics does predict a wavefunction collapse that depends on Alice's choice of measurement, they concluded that this was a form of action-at-distance and that the wavefunction could not be a complete description of reality. Other physicists did not agree: they accepted the quantum wavefunction as complete and questioned the nature of locality and reality assumed in the EPR paper.

In 1964 John Stewart Bell investigated whether it might be possible to fulfill Einstein's goal—to "complete" quantum theory—with local hidden variables to explain the correlations between spatially separated particles as predicted by quantum theory. Bell established a criterion to distinguish between local hidden-variables theory and quantum theory by measuring specific values of correlations between entangled particles. Subsequent experimental tests have shown that some quantum effects do violate Bell's inequalities and cannot be reproduced by a local hidden-variables theory. Bell's theorem depends on carefully defined models of locality.

=== Locality and hidden variables ===
Bell described local causality in terms of probability needed for analysis of quantum mechanics. Using the notation that $P(\mathbf{r} \mid g)$ for the probability of a result $\mathbf{r}$ with given state $g$, Bell investigated the probability distribution
$$P(\mathbf{ab} \mid AB, \lambda),$$
where $\lambda$ represents hidden state variables set (locally) when the two particles are initially co-located. If local causality holds, then the probabilities observed by Alice and by Bob should be only coupled by the hidden variables, and we can show that
$$P(\mathbf{ab} \mid AB, \lambda) = P(\mathbf{a} \mid A, \lambda) P(\mathbf{b} \mid B, \lambda).$$
Bell proved that a consequence of this factorization are limits on the correlations observed by Alice and Bob known as Bell inequalities. Since quantum mechanics predicts correlations stronger than this limit, locally set hidden variables cannot be added to "complete" quantum theory as desired by the EPR paper.

Numerous experiments specifically designed to probe the issues of locality confirm the predictions of quantum mechanics; these include experiments where the two measurement locations are more than a kilometer apart. The 2022 Nobel Prize in Physics was awarded to Alain Aspect, John Clauser and Anton Zeilinger, in part "for experiments with entangled photons, establishing the violation of Bell inequalities". The specific aspect of quantum theory that leads to these correlations is termed quantum entanglement, and versions of Bell's scenario are now used to verify entanglement experimentally.

==== Terminology ====
Bell's mathematical results, when compared to experimental data, eliminate local hidden-variable mathematical quantum theories. But the interpretation of the math with respect to the physical world remains under debate. Bell described the assumptions behind his work as "local causality", shortened to "locality"; later authors referred to the assumptions as local realism. These different names do not alter the mathematical assumptions.

A review of papers using this phrase suggests that a common (classical) physics definition of realism is

the assumption that measurement outcomes are well defined prior to and independent of the measurements.

This definition includes classical concepts like "well-defined", which conflicts with quantum superposition, and "prior to ... measurements", which implies (metaphysical) preexistence of properties. Specifically, the term local realism in the context of Bell's theorem cannot be viewed as a kind of "realism" involving locality other than the kind implied by the Bell screening assumption. This conflict between common ideas of realism and quantum mechanics requires careful analysis whenever local realism is discussed. Adding a "locality" modifier, that the results of two spatially well-separated measurements cannot causally affect each other, does not make the combination relate to Bell's proof; the only interpretation that Bell assumed was the one he called local causality. Consequently, Bell's theorem does not restrict the possibility of nonlocal variables as well as theories based on retrocausality or superdeterminism.

Because of the probabilistic nature of wave function collapse, this apparent violation of locality in quantum mechanics cannot be used to transmit information faster than light, in accordance to the no communication theorem. Asher Peres distinguishes between weak and strong nonlocality, the latter referring to the theories that allow faster-than-light communication. Under these terms, quantum mechanics would allow weakly nonlocal correlations but not strong nonlocality.

== Relativistic quantum mechanics ==
One of the main principles of quantum field theory is the principle of locality. The field operators and the Lagrangian density describing the dynamics of the fields are local, in the sense that interactions are not described by action-at-a-distance. This condition can be achieved by avoiding terms in the Lagrangian that are products of two fields that depend on distant coordinates. Specifically, in relativistic quantum field theory, to enforce the principles of locality and causality the following condition is required: if there are two observables, each localized within two distinct spacetime regions which happen to be at a spacelike separation from each other, the operators of observables must commute. This condition is sometimes imposed as one of the axioms of relativistic quantum field theory. Operators that commute are not correlated and so cannot influence each other (they are simultaneously observable), so imposing a requirement that the operators of observables with a spacelike separation should commute guarantees that the quantum field theory will respect causality.

== See also ==
- Cluster decomposition
- Counterfactual definiteness
- Einstein's thought experiments
- Local hidden-variable theory
- Non-locality (disambiguation)
- Quantum nonlocality
