= Born rule =

Calculation rule in quantum mechanics

The Born rule is a postulate of quantum mechanics that gives the probability that a measurement of a quantum system will yield a given result. In one commonly used application, it states that the probability density for finding a particle at a given position is proportional to the square of the amplitude of the system's wavefunction at that position. It was formulated and published by German physicist Max Born in July 1926.

== Details ==
The Born rule states that an observable, measured in a system with normalized wave function $|\psi\rang$ (see Bra–ket notation), corresponds to a self-adjoint operator $A$ whose spectrum is discrete if:

- the measured result will be one of the eigenvalues $\lambda$ of $A$, and
- the probability of measuring a given eigenvalue $\lambda_i$ will equal $\lang\psi|P_i|\psi\rang$, where $P_i$ is the projection onto the eigenspace of $A$ corresponding to $\lambda_i$.

(In the case where the eigenspace of $A$ corresponding to $\lambda_i$ is one-dimensional and spanned by the normalized eigenvector $|\lambda_i\rang$, $P_i$ is equal to $|\lambda_i\rang\lang\lambda_i|$, so the probability $\lang\psi|P_i|\psi\rang$ is equal to $\lang\psi|\lambda_i\rang\lang\lambda_i|\psi\rang$. Since the complex number $\lang\lambda_i|\psi\rang$ is known as the probability amplitude that the state vector $|\psi\rang$ assigns to the eigenvector $|\lambda_i\rang$, it is common to describe the Born rule as saying that probability is equal to the amplitude-squared (really the amplitude times its own complex conjugate). Equivalently, the probability can be written as $\big|\lang\lambda_i|\psi\rang\big|^2$.)

In the case where the spectrum of $A$ is not wholly discrete, the spectral theorem proves the existence of a certain projection-valued measure (PVM) $Q$, the spectral measure of $A$. In this case:

- the probability that the result of the measurement lies in a measurable set $M$ is given by $\lang\psi|Q(M)|\psi\rang$.

For example, a single structureless particle can be described by a wave function $\psi$ that depends upon position coordinates $(x, y, z)$ and a time coordinate $t$. The Born rule implies that the probability density function $p$ for the result of a measurement of the particle's position at time $t_0$ is:
$$p(x, y, z, t_0) = |\psi(x, y, z, t_0)|^2.$$
The Born rule can also be employed to calculate probabilities (for measurements with discrete sets of outcomes) or probability densities (for continuous-valued measurements) for other observables, like momentum, energy, and angular momentum.

In some applications, this treatment of the Born rule is generalized using positive-operator-valued measures (POVM). A POVM is a measure whose values are positive semi-definite operators on a Hilbert space. POVMs are a generalization of von Neumann measurements and, correspondingly, quantum measurements described by POVMs are a generalization of quantum measurements described by self-adjoint observables. In rough analogy, a POVM is to a PVM what a mixed state is to a pure state. Mixed states are needed to specify the state of a subsystem of a larger system (see purification of quantum state); analogously, POVMs are necessary to describe the effect on a subsystem of a projective measurement performed on a larger system. POVMs are the most general kind of measurement in quantum mechanics and can also be used in quantum field theory. They are extensively used in the field of quantum information.

In the simplest case of a POVM with a finite number of elements acting on a finite-dimensional Hilbert space, a POVM is a set of positive semi-definite matrices $\{F_i\}$ on a Hilbert space $\mathcal{H}$ that sum to the identity matrix,:
$$\sum_{i=1}^n F_i = I.$$

The POVM element $F_i$ is associated with the measurement outcome $i$, such that the probability of obtaining it when making a measurement on the quantum state $\rho$ is given by:

$$p(i) = \operatorname{tr}(\rho F_i),$$

where $\operatorname{tr}$ is the trace operator. This is the POVM version of the Born rule. When the quantum state being measured is a pure state $|\psi\rangle$ this formula reduces to:
$$p(i) = \operatorname{tr}\big(|\psi\rangle\langle\psi| F_i\big) = \langle\psi|F_i|\psi\rangle.$$

The Born rule, together with the unitarity of the time evolution operator $e^{-i\hat{H}t}$ (or, equivalently, the Hamiltonian $\hat{H}$ being Hermitian), implies the unitarity of the theory: a wave function that is time-evolved by a unitary operator will remain properly normalized. (In the more general case where one considers the time evolution of a density matrix, proper normalization is ensured by requiring that the time evolution is a trace-preserving, completely positive map.)

== History ==
The Born rule was formulated by Born in a 1926 paper. In this paper, Born solves the Schrödinger equation for a scattering problem and, inspired by Albert Einstein and Einstein's probabilistic rule for the photoelectric effect, concludes, in a footnote, that the Born rule gives the only possible interpretation of the solution. (The main body of the article says that the amplitude "gives the probability" [bestimmt die Wahrscheinlichkeit], while the footnote added in proof says that the probability is proportional to the square of its magnitude.) In 1954, together with Walther Bothe, Born was awarded the Nobel Prize in Physics for this and other work. John von Neumann discussed the application of spectral theory to Born's rule in his 1932 book.

=== Derivation from more basic principles ===
Gleason's theorem shows that the Born rule can be derived from the usual mathematical representation of measurements in quantum physics. Andrew M. Gleason first proved the theorem in 1957, prompted by a question posed by George W. Mackey. This theorem was historically significant for the role it played in showing that wide classes of hidden-variable theories are inconsistent with quantum physics.

Several other researchers have also tried to derive the Born rule from more basic principles. A number of derivations have been proposed in the context of the many-worlds interpretation. These include the decision-theory approach pioneered by David Deutsch and later developed by Hilary Greaves and David Wallace; and an "envariance" approach by Wojciech H. Zurek. These proofs have, however, been criticized as circular. In 2018, an approach based on self-locating uncertainty was suggested by Charles Sebens and Sean M. Carroll; this has also been criticized. In 2019, Lluís Masanes, Thomas Galley, and Markus Müller proposed a derivation based on postulates including the possibility of state estimation. In 2021, Simon Saunders produced a branch counting derivation of the Born rule. The crucial feature of this approach is to define the branches so that they all have the same magnitude or 2-norm. The ratios of the numbers of branches thus defined give the probabilities of the various outcomes of a measurement, in accordance with the Born rule.

It has also been claimed that pilot-wave theory can be used to statistically derive the Born rule, though this remains controversial.

Within the QBist interpretation of quantum theory, the Born rule is seen as an extension of the normative principle of coherence, which ensures self-consistency of probability assessments across a whole set of such assessments. It can be shown that an agent gambling on the outcomes of measurements on a sufficiently quantum-like system, refusing to use the Born rule when placing bets, is vulnerable to a Dutch book.
