= Kochen–Specker theorem =

Theorem constraining types of hidden-variable theories

In quantum mechanics, the Kochen–Specker (KS) theorem, also known as the Bell–KS theorem, is a "no-go" theorem proved by John S. Bell in 1966 and by Simon B. Kochen and Ernst Specker in 1967. It places certain constraints on the permissible types of hidden-variable theories, which try to explain the predictions of quantum mechanics in a context-independent way. The version of the theorem proved by Kochen and Specker also gave an explicit example for this constraint in terms of a finite number of state vectors.

The Kochen–Specker theorem is a complement to Bell's theorem. While Bell's theorem established nonlocality to be a feature of any hidden-variable theory that recovers the predictions of quantum mechanics, the Kochen–Specker theorem established contextuality to be an inevitable feature of such theories.

The theorem proves that there is a contradiction between two basic assumptions of the hidden-variable theories intended to reproduce the results of quantum mechanics: that all hidden variables corresponding to quantum-mechanical observables have definite values at any given time, and that the values of those variables are intrinsic and independent of the device used to measure them. The contradiction is caused by the fact that quantum-mechanical observables need not be commutative. It turns out to be impossible to simultaneously embed all the commuting subalgebras of the algebra of these observables in one commutative algebra, assumed to represent the classical structure of the hidden-variables theory, if the Hilbert space dimension is at least three.

The Kochen–Specker theorem excludes hidden-variable theories that assume that elements of physical reality can all be consistently represented simultaneously by the quantum mechanical Hilbert space formalism disregarding the context of a particular framework (technically, a projective decomposition of the identity operator) related to the experiment or analytical viewpoint under consideration. As succinctly worded by Christopher Isham and Jeremy Butterfield, (under the assumption of a universal probabilistic sample space as in non-contextual hidden-variable theories) the Kochen–Specker theorem "asserts the impossibility of assigning values to all physical quantities whilst, at the same time, preserving the functional relations between them".

== History ==
The KS theorem is an important step in the debate on the (in)completeness of quantum mechanics, boosted in 1935 by the criticism of the Copenhagen assumption of completeness in the article by Albert Einstein, Boris Podolsky and Nathan Rosen, creating the so-called EPR paradox. This paradox is derived from the assumption that a quantum-mechanical measurement result is generated in a deterministic way as a consequence of the existence of an element of physical reality assumed to be present before the measurement as a property of the microscopic object. In the EPR article it was assumed that the measured value of a quantum-mechanical observable can play the role of such an element of physical reality. As a consequence of this metaphysical supposition, the EPR criticism was not taken very seriously by the majority of the physics community. Moreover, in his answer Niels Bohr had pointed to an ambiguity in the EPR article, to the effect that it assumes that you can suppose nothing would have changed in the distant results of the measurements changing the local measurement basis, even if all the universal context was different. Taking into account the contextuality stemming from the measurement arrangement would, according to Bohr, make invalid the EPR reasoning. It was subsequently observed by Einstein that Bohr's reliance on contextuality implies nonlocality ("spooky action at a distance"), and that, in consequence, one would have to accept incompleteness if one wanted to avoid nonlocality.

In the 1950s and 1960s two lines of development were open for those not averse to metaphysics, both lines improving on the no hidden variables proof presented by John von Neumann, purporting to prove the impossibility of the hidden-variable theories yielding the same results as quantum mechanics. First, David Bohm developed an interpretation of quantum mechanics, generally accepted as a hidden-variable theory underpinning quantum mechanics. The nonlocality of Bohm's theory induced Bell to assume that quantum reality is nonlocal, and that probably only local hidden-variable theories are in disagreement with quantum mechanics. More importantly, Bell managed to lift the problem from the level of metaphysics to physics by deriving an inequality, the Bell inequality, that is capable of being experimentally tested.

A second line is the Kochen–Specker one. The essential difference from Bell's approach is that the possibility of underpinning quantum mechanics by a hidden-variable theory is dealt with independently of any reference to locality or nonlocality, but instead a stronger restriction than locality is made, namely that hidden variables are exclusively associated with the quantum system being measured; none are associated with the measurement apparatus. This is called the assumption of non-contextuality. Contextuality is related here with incompatibility of quantum-mechanical observables, incompatibility being associated with mutual exclusiveness of measurement arrangements. The Kochen–Specker theorem states that no non-contextual hidden-variable model can reproduce the predictions of quantum theory when the dimension of the Hilbert space is three or more.

Bell published a proof of the Kochen–Specker theorem in 1966, in an article which had been submitted to a journal earlier than his famous Bell-inequality article, but was lost on an editor's desk for two years. Considerably simpler proofs than the Kochen–Specker one were given later, amongst others, by N. David Mermin and by Asher Peres. However, many simpler proofs only establish the theorem for Hilbert spaces of higher dimension, e.g., from dimension four.

The first experimental test of contextuality was performed in 2000, and a version without detection, sharpness and compatibility loopholes was achieved in 2022.

== Overview ==
The KS theorem explores whether it is possible to embed the set of quantum-mechanical observables into a set of classical quantities, in spite of the fact that all classical quantities are mutually compatible. The first observation made in the Kochen–Specker article is that this is possible in a trivial way, namely, by ignoring the algebraic structure of the set of quantum-mechanical observables. Indeed, let p_{A}(a_{k}) be the probability that observable A has value a_{k}, then the product Π_{A} p_{A}(a_{k}), taken over all possible observables A, is a valid joint probability distribution, yielding all probabilities of quantum-mechanical observables by taking marginals. Kochen and Specker note that this joint probability distribution is not acceptable, however, since it ignores all correlations between the observables. Thus, in quantum mechanics A^{2} has value a_{k}^{2} if A has value a_{k}, implying that the values of A and A^{2} are highly correlated.

More generally, it is required by Kochen and Specker that for an arbitrary function f the value $v\big(f(\mathbf A)\big)$ of observable $f(\mathbf A)$ satisfies

$$v\big(f(\mathbf A)\big) = f\big(v(\mathbf A)\big).$$

If A_{1} and A_{2} are compatible (commeasurable) observables, then, by the same token, we should have the following two equalities:

$$v(c_1 \mathbf A_1 + c_2 \mathbf A_2) = c_1 v(\mathbf A_1) + c_2 v(\mathbf A_2),$$

$c_1$ and $c_2$ real, and

$$v(\mathbf A_1 \mathbf A_2) = v(\mathbf A_1) v(\mathbf A_2).$$

The first of these is a considerable weakening compared to von Neumann's assumption that this equality should hold independently of whether A_{1} and A_{2} are compatible or incompatible. Kochen and Specker proved that a value assignment is not possible even on the basis of these weaker assumptions. In order to do so, they restricted the observables to a special class, namely, so-called yes–no observables, having only values 0 and 1, corresponding to projection operators on the eigenvectors of certain orthogonal bases of a Hilbert space.

As long as the Hilbert space is at least three-dimensional, they were able to find a set of 117 such projection operators, not allowing to attribute to each of them in an unambiguous way either value 0 or 1. Instead of the rather involved proof by Kochen and Specker, it is more illuminating to reproduce here one of the much simpler proofs given much later, which employs a lower number of projection operators, but only proves the theorem when the dimension of the Hilbert space is at least 4. It turns out that it is possible to obtain a similar result on the basis of a set of only 18 projection operators.

In order to do so, it is sufficient to realize that if u_{1}, u_{2}, u_{3} and u_{4} are the four orthogonal vectors of an orthogonal basis in the four-dimensional Hilbert space, then the projection operators P_{1}, P_{2}, P_{3}, P_{4} on these vectors are all mutually commuting (and, hence, correspond to compatible observables, allowing a simultaneous attribution of values 0 or 1). Since

$$\mathbf P_1 + \mathbf P_2 + \mathbf P_3 + \mathbf P_4 = \mathbf I,$$

it follows that

$$v(\mathbf P_1 + \mathbf P_2 + \mathbf P_3 + \mathbf P_4) = v(\mathbf I) = 1.$$

But since

$$v(\mathbf P_1 + \mathbf P_2 + \mathbf P_3 + \mathbf P_4) =
v(\mathbf P_1) + v(\mathbf P_2) + v(\mathbf P_3) + v(\mathbf P_4),$$

it follows from $v(\mathbf P_i)$ = 0 or 1, $i = 1, \ldots, 4$, that out of the four values $v(\mathbf P_1), v(\mathbf P_2), v(\mathbf P_3), v(\mathbf P_4)$ one must be 1, while the other three must be 0.

Adán Cabello, extending an argument developed by Michael Kernaghan considered 9 orthogonal bases, each basis corresponding to a column of the following table, in which the basis vectors are explicitly displayed. The bases are chosen in such a way that each projector appears in exactly two contexts, thus establishing functional relations between contexts.

| u_{1} | (0, 0, 0, 1) | (0, 0, 0, 1) | (1, −1, 1, −1) | (1, −1, 1, −1) | (0, 0, 1, 0) | (1, −1, −1, 1) | (1, 1, −1, 1) | (1, 1, −1, 1) | (1, 1, 1, −1) |
| u_{2} | (0, 0, 1, 0) | (0, 1, 0, 0) | (1, −1, −1, 1) | (1, 1, 1, 1) | (0, 1, 0, 0) | (1, 1, 1, 1) | (1, 1, 1, −1) | (−1, 1, 1, 1) | (−1, 1, 1, 1) |
| u_{3} | (1, 1, 0, 0) | (1, 0, 1, 0) | (1, 1, 0, 0) | (1, 0, −1, 0) | (1, 0, 0, 1) | (1, 0, 0, −1) | (1, −1, 0, 0) | (1, 0, 1, 0) | (1, 0, 0, 1) |
| u_{4} | (1, −1, 0, 0) | (1, 0, −1, 0) | (0, 0, 1, 1) | (0, 1, 0, −1) | (1, 0, 0, −1) | (0, 1, −1, 0) | (0, 0, 1, 1) | (0, 1, 0, −1) | (0, 1, −1, 0) |

Now the "no-go" theorem follows by making sure that the following is impossible: to place a value, either a 1 or a 0, into each compartment of the table above in such a way that:

(a) the value 1 appears exactly once per column, the other entries in the column being 0;
(b) equally colored compartments contain the same value – either both contain 1 or both contain 0.

As it happens, all we have to do now is ask the question, how many times should the value 1 appear in the table? On the one hand, (a) implies that 1 should appear 9 times: there are 9 columns and (a) says that 1 should appear exactly once per column. On the other hand, (b) implies that 1 should appear an even number of times: the compartments all come in equally colored pairs, and (b) says that if one member of a pair contains 1, then the other member must contain 1 as well. To repeat, (a) says that 1 appears 9 times, while (b) says that it appears an even number of times. Since 9 is not even, it follows that (a) and (b) are mutually contradictory; no distribution of 1s and 0s into the compartments could possibly satisfy both.

The usual proof of Bell's theorem (CHSH inequality) can also be converted into a simple proof of the KS theorem in dimension at least 4. Bell's setup involves four measurements with four outcomes (four pairs of a simultaneous binary measurement in each wing of the experiment) and four with two outcomes (the two binary measurements in each wing of the experiment, unaccompanied), thus 24 projection operators.

== Remarks ==
=== Contextuality ===
In the Kochen–Specker article the possibility is discussed that the value attribution $v(\mathbf A)$ may be context-dependent, i.e. observables corresponding to equal vectors in different columns of the table need not have equal values because different columns correspond to different measurement arrangements. Since subquantum reality (as described by the hidden-variable theory) may be dependent on the measurement context, it is possible that relations between quantum-mechanical observables and hidden variables are just homomorphic rather than isomorphic. This would make obsolete the requirement of a context-independent value attribution. Hence, the KS theorem only excludes noncontextual hidden-variable theories. The possibility of contextuality has given rise to the so-called modal interpretations of quantum mechanics.

=== Different levels of description ===
By the KS theorem the impossibility is proven of Einstein's assumption that an element of physical reality is represented by a value of a quantum-mechanical observable. The value of a quantum-mechanical observable refers in the first place to the final position of the pointer of a measuring instrument, which comes into being only during the measurement, and which, for this reason, cannot play the role of an element of physical reality. Elements of physical reality, if existing, would seem to need a subquantum (hidden-variable) theory for their description rather than quantum mechanics. In later publications the Bell inequalities are discussed on the basis of hidden-variable theories in which the hidden variable is supposed to refer to a subquantum property of the microscopic object different from the value of a quantum-mechanical observable. This opens up the possibility of distinguishing different levels of reality described by different theories, which had already been practised by Louis de Broglie. For such more general theories the KS theorem is applicable only if the measurement is assumed to be a faithful one, in the sense that there is a deterministic relation between a subquantum element of physical reality and the value of the observable found on measurement.

== See also ==
- Quantum foundations
- Quantum indeterminacy
