= Mathematical Foundations of Quantum Mechanics =

1932 book by John von Neumann

- Author: John von Neumann
- Original title: Mathematische Grundlagen der Quantenmechanik
- Language: German
- Subject: Quantum mechanics
- Published: 1932
- Publisher: Springer
- Publication place: Berlin, Germany

Mathematical Foundations of Quantum Mechanics (German: Mathematische Grundlagen der Quantenmechanik) is a quantum mechanics book written by John von Neumann in 1932. It is an important early work in the development of the mathematical formulation of quantum mechanics. The book mainly summarizes results that von Neumann had published in earlier papers.

Von Neumann formalized quantum mechanics using the concept of Hilbert spaces and linear operators. He acknowledged the previous work by Paul Dirac on the mathematical formalization of quantum mechanics, but was skeptical of Dirac's use of delta functions. He wrote the book in an attempt to be even more mathematically rigorous than Dirac. It was von Neumann's last book in German, afterwards he started publishing in English.

== Publication history ==
The book was originally published in German in 1932 by Springer. It was translated into French by Alexandru Proca in 1946, and into Spanish in 1949. An English translation by Robert T. Beyer was published in 1955 by Princeton University Press. A Russian translation, edited by Nikolay Bogolyubov, was published by Nauka in 1964. A new English edition, edited by Nicholas A. Wheeler, was published in 2018 by Princeton University Press.

== Table of contents ==
According to the 2018 version, the main chapters are:

1. Introductory considerations
2. Abstract Hilbert space
3. The quantum statistics
4. Deductive development of the theory
5. General considerations
6. The measuring process

== Measurement process ==
In chapter 6, von Neumann develops the theory of quantum measurement. Von Neumann addresses measurement by outlining two kind of processes: (Note: Some authors consider process III to be the collapse (state reduction) of the wave function.)

- Process I: during measurement a quantum state of a system evolves into a mixed state of eigenstates of the measured observable. This process is non-causal (the outcome of a single measurement does not depend only on the initial state) and irreversible.
- Process II: when the system is unobserved, the state evolves according to Schrödinger equation. This process is causal and reversible.

Von Neumann was concerned that having two incompatible processes violated what he called the principle of psycho-physical parallelism, indicating the need that every mental process can be described as a physical process. Von Neumann argues that this issue does not appear in quantum mechanics as it set the border between observed and observer arbitrarily along a sequence of subsystems.

The sequence begins with a quantum system whose observable is to be measured. When the system interacts with a measuring device, they become entangled. As a result, the system does not end up in a definite eigenstate of the observable, and the measuring device does not display a specific value. When the observer is added to the picture, the description implies that their body (including the brain) are also entangled with the measuring apparatus and the system. This sequence is known as the von Neumann chain. The problem then becomes understanding how collapse to one of the eigenstates emerges from this chain. Von Neumann demonstrated that, when it comes to the final outcomes, the chain can be interrupted at any and a wave function collapse can be introduced at any point to explain the results.

=== Interpretations ===
Von Neumann measurement scheme is part of the orthodox Copenhagen interpretation which postulates a collapse, however alternative interpretations of quantum mechanics have come out of this idea. Eugene Wigner considered that the von Neumann chain implied that consciousness causes collapse of the wave function. However Wigner rejected this idea after the formalism of quantum decoherence was developed. Hugh Everett III developed the many-worlds interpretation based on von Neumann's processes, by keeping only process II.

== No hidden variables proof ==
One significant passage is its mathematical argument against the idea of hidden variables. Von Neumann's claim rested on the assumption that any linear combination of Hermitian operators represents an observable and the expectation value of such combined operator follows the combination of the expectation values of the operators themselves.

Von Neumann's makes the following assumptions:

1. For an observable $R$, a function $f$ of that observable is represented by $f(R)$.
2. For the sum of observables $R$ and $S$ is represented by the operation $R+S$, independently of the mutual commutation relations.
3. The correspondence between observables and Hermitian operators is one to one.
4. If the observable $R$ is a non-negative operator, then its expected value $\langle R\rangle\geq0$.
5. Additivity postulate: For arbitrary observables $R$ and $S$, and real numbers $a$ and $b$, we have $\langle aR+bS\rangle=a\langle R\rangle+b\langle S\rangle$ for all possible ensembles.

Von Neumann then shows that one can write

$$\langle R\rangle=\sum_{m,n}\rho_{nm} R_{mn}=\mathrm{Tr}(\rho R)$$

for some $\rho$, where $R_{mn}$ and $\rho_{nm}$are the matrix elements in some basis. The proof concludes by noting that $\rho$ must be Hermitian and non-negative definite ($\langle \rho\rangle\geq0$) by construction. For von Neumann, this meant that the statistical operator representation of states could be deduced from the postulates. Consequently, there are no "dispersion-free" states: (Note: A dispersion-free state $|\psi\rangle$ has the property $\sigma_R=\langle\psi| R^2|\psi\rangle-\langle\psi| R|\psi\rangle^2=0$ for all $R$ (eigenstate or not).) it is impossible to prepare a system in such a way that all measurements have predictable results. But if hidden variables existed, then knowing the values of the hidden variables would make the results of all measurements predictable, and hence there can be no hidden variables. Von Neumann's argues that if dispersion-free states were found, assumptions 1 to 3 should be modified.

Von Neumann's concludes:

if there existed other, as yet undiscovered, physical quantities, in addition to those represented by the operators in quantum mechanics, because the relations assumed by quantum mechanics would have to fail already for the by now known quantities, those that we discussed above. It is therefore not, as is often assumed, a question of a re-interpretation of quantum mechanics, the present system of quantum mechanics would have to be objectively false, in order that another description of the elementary processes than the statistical one be possible.

— pp. 324-325

=== Rejection ===
This proof was rejected as early as 1935 by Grete Hermann who found a flaw in the proof. The additive postulate above holds for quantum states, but it does not need to apply for measurements of dispersion-free states, specifically when considering non-commuting observables. Dispersion-free states only require to recover additivity when averaging over the hidden parameters. For example, for a spin-1/2 system, measurements of $(\sigma_x +\sigma_y)$ can take values $\pm \sqrt{2}$ for a dispersion-free state, but independent measurements of $\sigma_x$ and $\sigma_y$ can only take values of $\pm 1$ (their sum can be $\pm 2$ or $0$). Thus there still the possibility that a hidden variable theory could reproduce quantum mechanics statistically.

However, Hermann's critique remained relatively unknown until 1974 when it was rediscovered by Max Jammer. In 1952, David Bohm constructed the Bohmian interpretation of quantum mechanics in terms of statistical argument, suggesting a limit to the validity of von Neumann's proof. The problem was brought back to wider attention by John Stewart Bell in 1966. Bell showed that the consequences of that assumption are at odds with results of incompatible measurements, which are not explicitly taken into von Neumann's considerations.

== Reception ==
It was considered the most complete book written in quantum mechanics at the time of release. It was praised for its axiomatic approach. A review by Jacob Tamarkin compared von Neumann's book to what the works on Niels Henrik Abel or Augustin-Louis Cauchy did for mathematical analysis in the 19th century, but for quantum mechanics.

Freeman Dyson said that he learned quantum mechanics from the book. Dyson remarks that in the 1940s, von Neumann's work was not very well cited in the English world, as the book was not translated into English until 1955, but also because the worlds of mathematics and physics were significantly distant at the time.

Max Jammer observed that Paul Dirac's primary motivation in writing The Principles of Quantum Mechanics (1930) was creating an exposition in physics, treating mathematics as a tool. In this regard, John von Neumann's Mathematical Foundations of Quantum Mechanics, with its uncompromising emphasis on mathematical rigour, was a supplement to Dirac's book.

== Works adapted in the book ==
- von Neumann, J. (1927). "Mathematische Begründung der Quantenmechanik [Mathematical Foundation of Quantum Mechanics]". Nachrichten von der Gesellschaft der Wissenschaften zu Göttingen, Mathematisch-Physikalische Klasse: 1–57.
- von Neumann, J. (1927). "Wahrscheinlichkeitstheoretischer Aufbau der Quantenmechanik [Probabilistic Theory of Quantum Mechanics]". Nachrichten von der Gesellschaft der Wissenschaften zu Göttingen, Mathematisch-Physikalische Klasse: 245–272.
- von Neumann, J. (1927). "Thermodynamik quantenmechanischer Gesamtheiten [Thermodynamics of Quantum Mechanical Quantities]". Nachrichten von der Gesellschaft der Wissenschaften zu Göttingen, Mathematisch-Physikalische Klasse. 102: 273–291.
- von Neumann, J. (1929). "Allgemeine Eigenwerttheorie Hermitescher Funktionaloperatoren [General Eigenvalue Theory of Hermitian Functional Operators]". Mathematische Annalen: 49–131. doi:10.1007/BF01782338.
- von Neumann, J. (1931). "Die Eindeutigkeit der Schrödingerschen Operatoren [The uniqueness of Schrödinger operators]". Mathematische Annalen. 104: 570–578. doi:10.1007/bf01457956. S2CID 120528257.

== See also ==
- Dirac–von Neumann axioms
- Heisenberg cut
- Timeline of quantum mechanics
