= Simon B. Kochen =

Canadian mathematician (born 1934)

- Born: 14 August 1934 (age 92); Antwerp, Belgium
- Education: McGill University; Princeton University
- Known for: Kochen–Specker theorem Ax–Kochen theorem Free will theorem p-adically closed field
- Awards: Cole Prize in Number Theory (1967); Guggenheim Fellowship (1962)
- Scientific career
- Fields: Mathematical physics
- Workplaces: Cornell University; Princeton University
- Thesis: Ultrafiltered Products and Arithmetical Extensions (1958)
- Doctoral advisor: Alonzo Church
- Doctoral students: Samuel Buss

Simon Bernhard Kochen (/ˈkoʊʃən/; born 14 August 1934) is a Canadian mathematician, working in the fields of model theory, number theory and quantum mechanics.

== Education and career ==
Kochen was born in Antwerp, Belgium, and escaped the Nazis with his family, thanks to a courageous Norwegian ship captain. Raised in England, he attended grammar school before moving to Canada. Kochen attended McGill University and obtained his bachelor’s and master’s degrees there. He moved to the US afterwards and received his Ph.D. (Ultrafiltered Products and Arithmetical Extensions) from Princeton University in 1958 under the direction of Alonzo Church. Since 1967 he has been a member of Princeton's Department of Mathematics. He chaired the department from 1989 to 1992 and became the Henry Burchard Fine Professor in mathematics in 1994. During 1966–1967 and 1978–1979, Kochen was at the Institute for Advanced Study.

In 1967 he was awarded, together with James Ax, the seventh Frank Nelson Cole Prize in Number Theory for a series of three joint papers on Diophantine problems involving p-adic techniques. Kochen and Ax also co-authored the Ax–Kochen theorem, an application of model theory to algebra.

In 1967 Kochen and Ernst Specker proved the Kochen–Specker theorem in quantum mechanics and quantum contextuality. In 2004 Kochen and John Horton Conway proved the free will theorem. The theorem states that if we have a certain amount of free will, then, subject to certain assumptions, so must some elementary particles.

== See also ==
- Borel–Cantelli lemma
