= Ernst Specker =

Swiss mathematician (1920–2011)

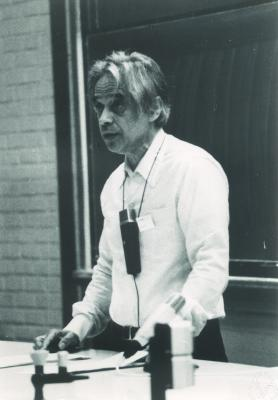
Ernst Specker, 1982

Ernst Paul Specker (11 February 1920, Zürich – 10 December 2011, Zürich) was a Swiss mathematician. Much of his most influential work was on Willard Van Orman Quine's New Foundations, a set theory with a universal set, but he is most famous for the Kochen–Specker theorem in quantum mechanics, showing that certain types of hidden-variable theories are impossible. He also proved the ordinal partition relation ω^{2} → (ω^{2}, 3)^{2}, thereby solving a problem of Paul Erdős.

Specker received his Ph.D. in 1949 from ETH Zurich, where he remained throughout his professional career.

== See also ==
- Specker sequence
- Baer–Specker group
