= Mary Bell (disambiguation) =

Mary Bell (born 1957) is an English woman who at age 11 was convicted of the manslaughter of two younger boys.

Mary Bell may also refer to:

== People ==
- Mary Bell (aviator) (1903–1979), Australian aviator
- Mary Bell (American Civil War nurse) (1840–?)
- Mary Bell (politician) (1885–1943), Scottish politician
- Mary A. Bell (1873–1941), African-American artist
- Mary Ann Bell (fl. 1806–fl. 1831), British fashion merchant, fashion designer and fashion journalist
- Mary Hayley Bell (1911–2005), English actress, writer and dramatist
- Mary Hemings Bell (1753–after 1834), freed slave once owned by U.S. president Thomas Jefferson
- Mary L. Bell (1901–1995), first African-American to own and operate a radio station in the city of Detroit, Michigan
- Mary and Molly Bell, disguised themselves as men and fought in the American Civil War
- Mary and Annie Bell (1844–1874), English Christian missionaries
- Mary Alexandra Bell Eastlake (1864–1951), née Bell, Canadian painter and jewelry maker
- Mary Bell Smith (1818–1894), also known as Mary Bell, American educator, social reformer, and writer
- Mary Ross Bell (1923–2022), physicist

== Fictional characters ==
- Flower Witch Mary Bell, a 1992 anime series, and the title character Mary Bell
- Marybell, a manga by Kimiko Uehara

== See also ==
- Mary Belle, a given name
