= Zhenjiang =

Zhenjiang 镇江市 Chinkiang
- Prefecture-level city
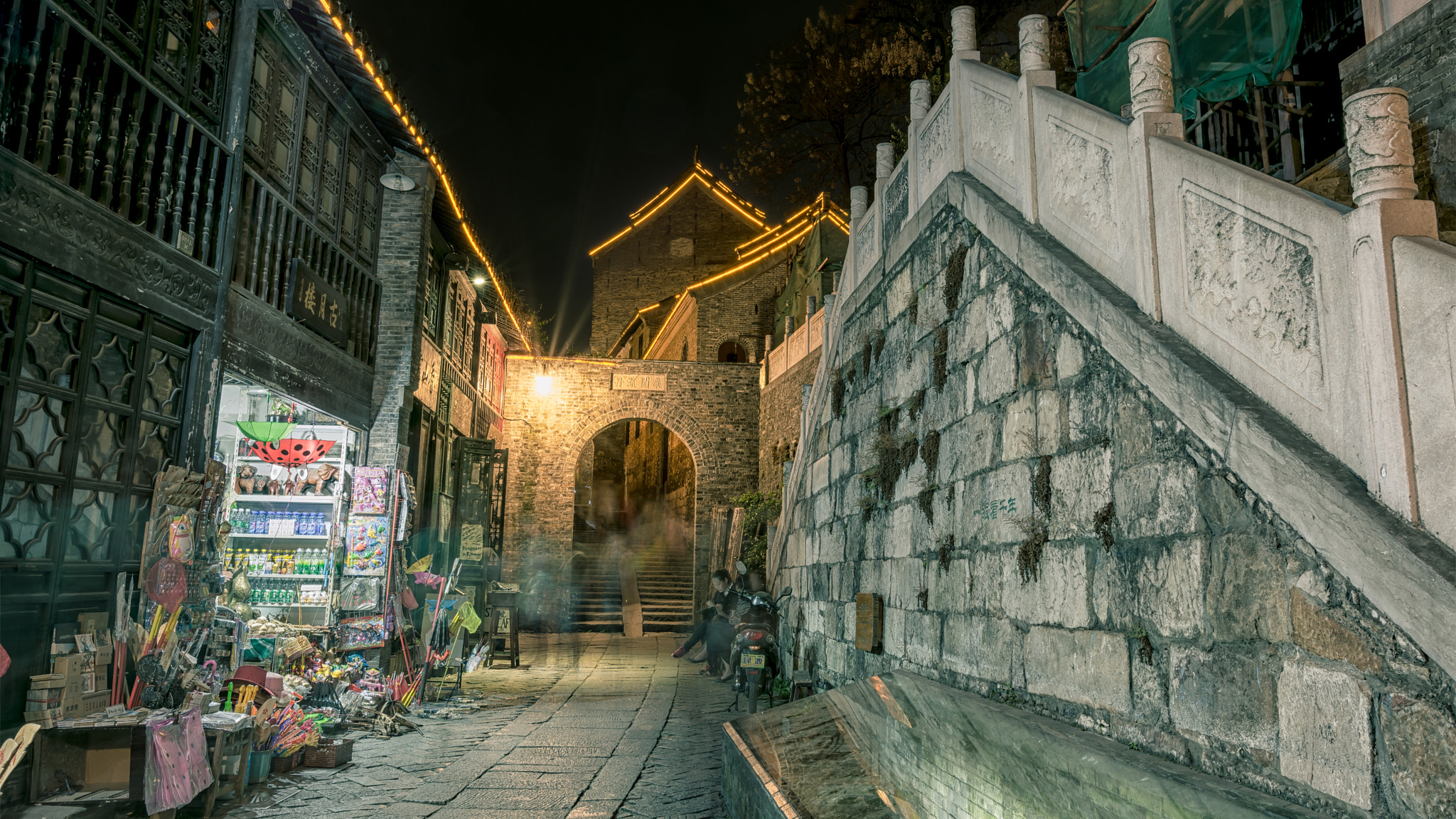
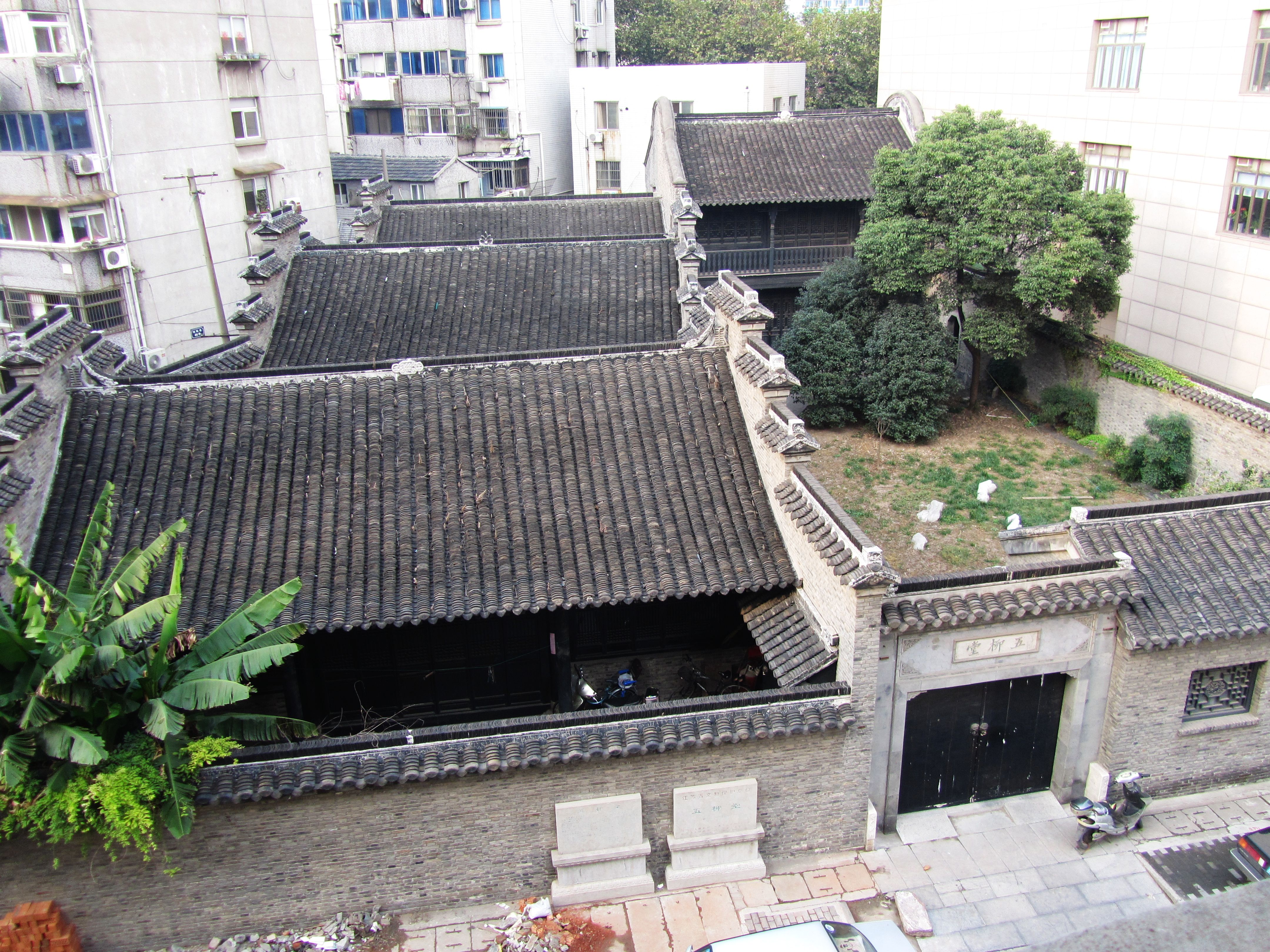
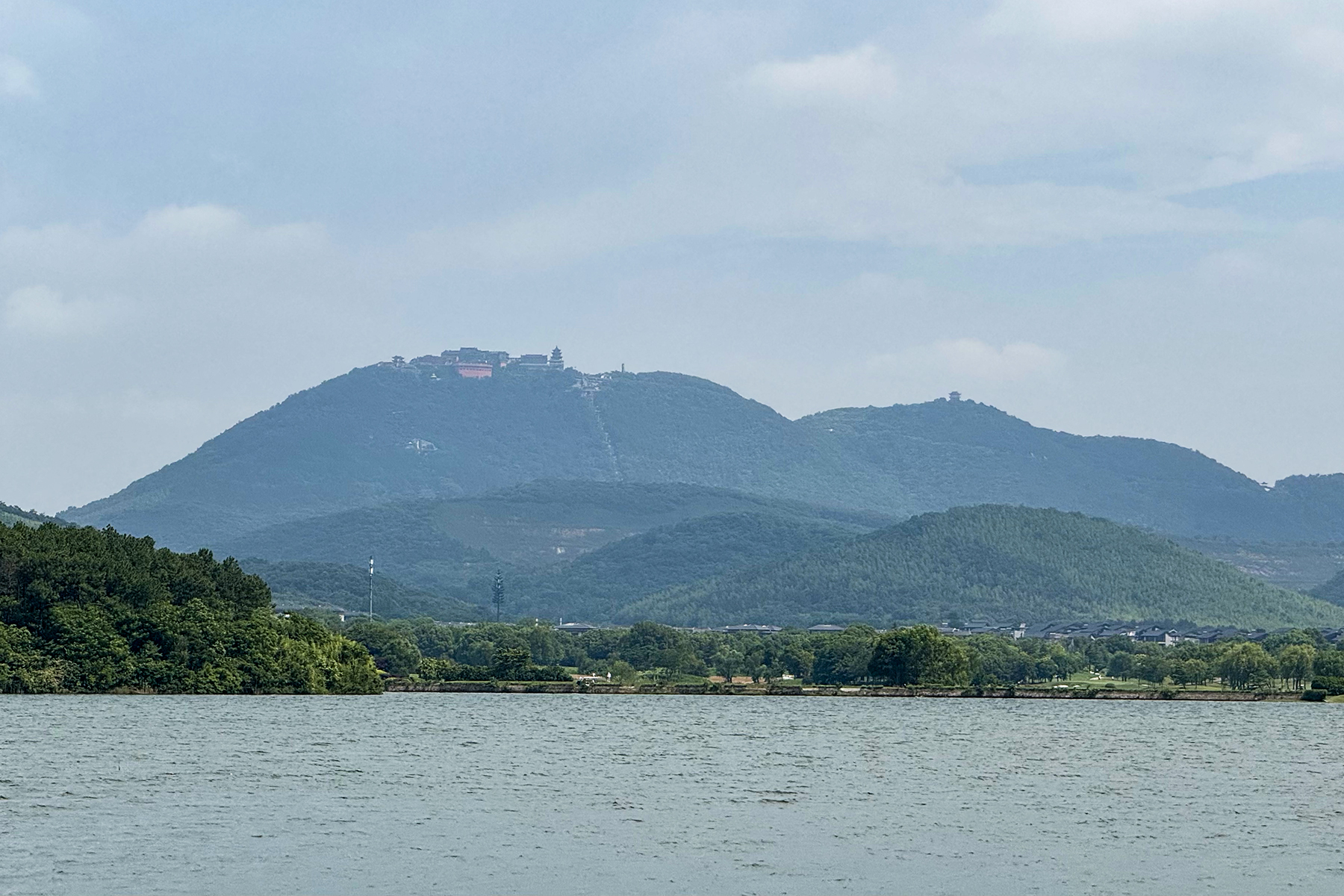
- Zhenjiang skyline Jinshan Temple Ancient Street in Xijin Ferry Wuliu Hall Maoshan Mountain Wufengshan Yangtze River Bridge

- Location of Zhenjiang City (red) in Jiangsu

- Location in Jiangsu Zhenjiang (Eastern China) Zhenjiang (China)
- Coordinates (Zhenjiang government): 32°11′17″N 119°25′26″E
- Country: People's Republic of China
- Province: Jiangsu
- Municipal seat: Runzhou District

Government
  - Party Secretary: Wu Qingwen (吴庆文)
  - Mayor: Xu Shuhai (徐曙海)

Area
  - Prefecture-level city: 3,837.259 km^{2} (1,481.574 sq mi)
  - Urban: 1,084.8 km^{2} (418.8 sq mi)
  - Metro: 1,084.8 km^{2} (418.8 sq mi)

Population (2020 census)
  - Prefecture-level city: 3,210,418
  - Density: 836.6436/km^{2} (2,166.897/sq mi)
  - Urban: 1,266,790
  - Urban density: 1,167.8/km^{2} (3,024.5/sq mi)
  - Metro: 1,266,790
  - Metro density: 1,167.8/km^{2} (3,024.5/sq mi)

GDP
  - Prefecture-level city: CN¥ 405 billion US$ 61.3 billion
  - Per capita: CN¥ 126,906; US$ 19,214
- Time zone: UTC+8 (China Standard)
- Postal code: 212000
- Area code: 511
- ISO 3166 code: CN-JS-11
- County-level divisions: 6
- Township-level divisions: 77
- License Plate Prefix: 苏L
- Website: www.zhenjiang.gov.cn

Zhenjiang
- Simplified Chinese: 镇江
- Traditional Chinese: 鎭江
- Postal: Chinkiang
- Literal meaning: Guarding the River; Guarded River
Transcriptions
Standard Mandarin
- Hanyu Pinyin: Zhènjiāng
- Wade–Giles: Chen^{4}-chiang^{1}
- IPA: [ʈʂə̂ntɕjáŋ]

Former names

Nanxuzhou
- Chinese: 南徐州
- Literal meaning: Southern Xuzhou
Transcriptions
Standard Mandarin
- Hanyu Pinyin: Nánxúzhōu

Zhenjiang, alternately romanized as Chinkiang, is a prefecture-level city in Jiangsu Province, China. It lies on the southern bank of the Yangtze River near its intersection with the Grand Canal. It is opposite Yangzhou (to its north) and between Nanjing (to its west) and Changzhou (to its east). Zhenjiang was formerly the provincial capital of Jiangsu and remains as an important transportation hub. As of the 2020 census, its total population was 3,210,418 inhabitants whom 1,266,790 lived in the built-up (or metro) area made of the 3 urban districts. The town is best known both in China and abroad for Chinkiang vinegar, a fragrant black vinegar that is a staple of Chinese cooking.

== Names ==
Prior to the adoption of Hanyu Pinyin, the city's name was typically romanized as Chin-keang-foo, Chen-kiang-fu, or Chinkiang.

== History ==
=== Early History ===
Human activity in Zhenjiang dates to the early Neolithic period. Excavations at the Zuohu (左湖) site reveal a continuous cultural sequence from the Majiabang to the Bronze Age Hushu culture. Adapted to the Ning-Zhen Hills, prehistoric inhabitants developed distinct ground-level dwellings that differ from contemporary Majiabang sites in the plains. The area is considered one of the early centers of rice cultivation in the lower Yangtze River valley.

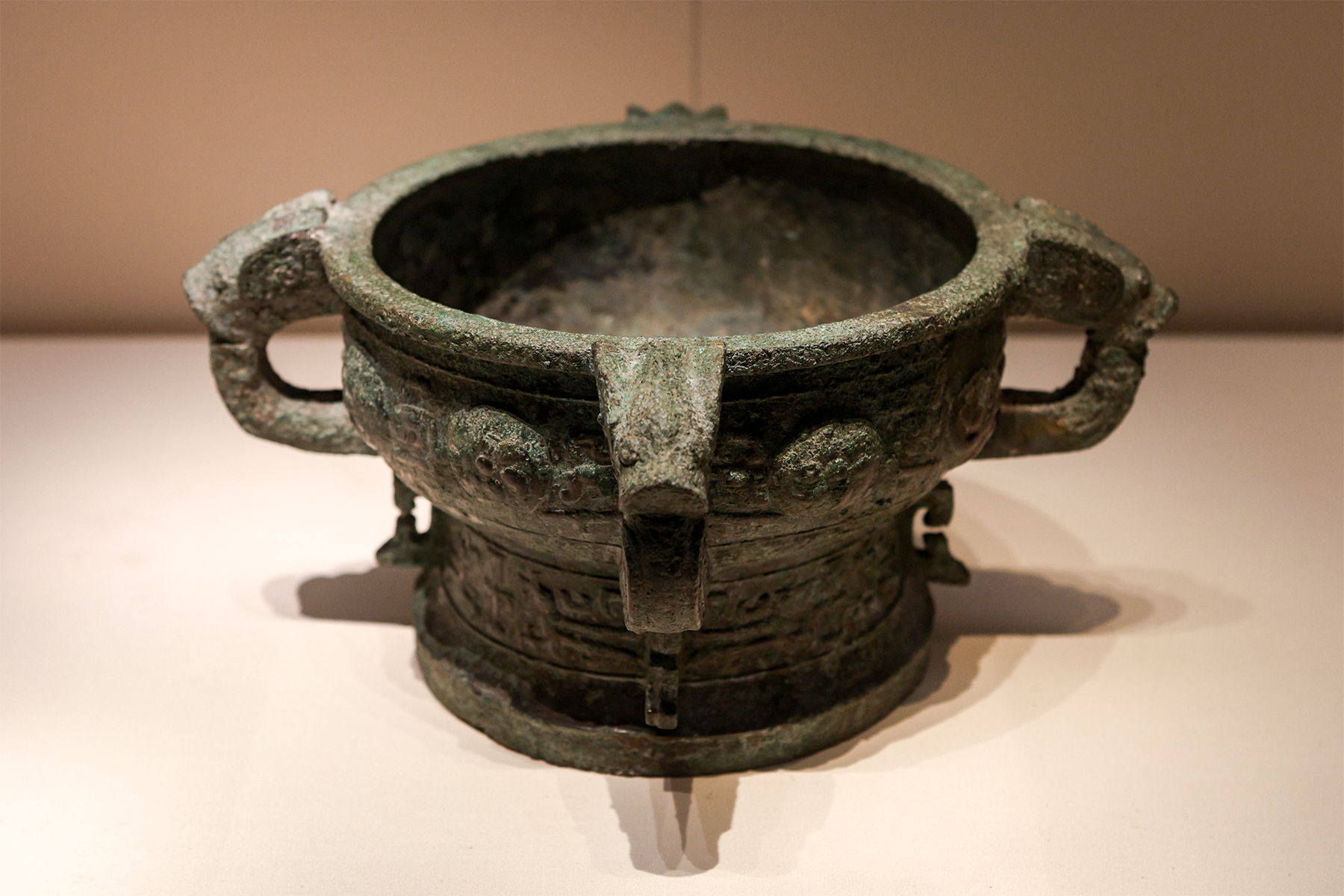
The Yi Hou Ze-gui (宜侯夨簋), National Museum of China

The Yi Hou Ze-gui (宜侯夨簋) unearthed at Dantu records the Zhou investiture of an aristocrat at "Yi," presumed to be the region where the vessel was discovered, including the granting of land and people, namely fengjian. Despite ongoing scholarly debate, it remains the only bronze inscription interpreted as providing epigraphical support for Sima Qian's account of Wu Taibo's enfeoffment in the Jiangnan region.

During the Spring and Autumn period, the region was incorporated into the State of Wu and first appeared in historical records under the name Zhufang (朱方). In 543 BC, Qing Feng, a minister from the State of Qi, fled to Wu seeking asylum following a failed power struggle. King Yuji of Wu granted him Zhufang as a fief. However, in 537 BC, King Ling of Chu led a coalition of feudal lords to besiege and capture Zhufang, subsequently executing Feng.

Until the 3rd century CE, the apex of the Yangtze River's funnel-shaped estuary was located near present-day Zhenjiang and Yangzhou. During the early imperial era, the counties of Dantu (丹徒) and Qu'e (曲阿) were established on the narrow coastal plains of this region. They served as major transit hubs for overland and river transport, linking the imperial center with the Lake Tai and Qiantang River regions.

At the turn of the 3rd century CE, the Sun clan—who later founded the state of Eastern Wu—used Dantu as a primary administrative base, and the family patriarch Sun Jian was interred in nearby Qu'e. In 209, Sun Quan renamed this base "Jing" (京), which subsequently became known as Jingkou (京口). Situated about 80 km east of Nanjing (then Jianye or Jiankang), Jingkou developed into a strategic gateway on the lower Yangtze and an important military outpost guarding the capital.

In 211, Sun Quan moved his seat of government to Jianye. To improve transport links between the new capital and the Kuaiji region while bypassing the navigational hazards of the Yangtze estuary, the Eastern Wu regime commissioned the Pogang Canal (破岡瀆) and other waterways through the Ning–Zhen Hills. These canals connected the capital with its surrounding agricultural heartlands.

Although located at a strategic transport hub, early Jingkou remained sparsely populated and underdeveloped. A hunting preserve southeast of the town served the Sun clan, while much of the surrounding land was organized as state farms (tuntian) under an agricultural command based in Biling (毗陵).

=== Six Dynasties to Tang ===
Following the fall of the Central Plains and the southward retreat of the imperial court, hundreds of thousands of displaced northerners—many of them from north of the Huai River—were resettled in and around Jingkou and the neighboring Zhenjiang and Changzhou areas. Jingkou thus developed into a major garrison for controlling Jiangnan, defending the capital Nanjing, and resisting seaborne incursions.

In the early 4th century, Xi Jian—a general of northern émigré origin and regional governor of Xu—strategically garrisoned Jingkou to counter internal rebellions. He relocated his military headquarters and the nominal Xu provincial administration from the north bank of the Yangtze to Jingkou, establishing the new "Northern Headquarters" (Beifu, 北府) there.

Building on this foundation, Xie Xuan, who oversaw the defense of the lower Yangtze, formally organized the Beifu Army by recruiting soldiers from the northern migrant communities. This force of 80,000 troops became a central political and military power after defeating a numerically superior invading force in the Battle of Fei River in 383 CE.

In the wake of a series of political struggles, the Beifu Army grew increasingly autonomous, with its command transitioning from the hands of top-tier aristocratic families to those of lower-ranking gentry. (Note: Key figures involved in this transition of control includedWang Gong, Liu Laozhi, and Sima Yuanxian.)

At the turn of the 5th century, Liu Yu, a commander who hailed from Jingkou's own migrant community, rose to prominence as the leader of the Beifu Army. He eventually overthrew the Eastern Jin and founded his own dynasty, the Liu Song. In his last will, Liu Yu decreed that Jingkou must be governed by a trusted imperial clansman.

Following the Liu Song's successful campaigns to recover territory in the north, the original Xu province or Xuzhou, with its seat in Pengcheng, was reclaimed. To distinguish it from the original one, the administration based in Jingkou was officially renamed the Southern Xu Province (Nan Xuzhou, 南徐州).

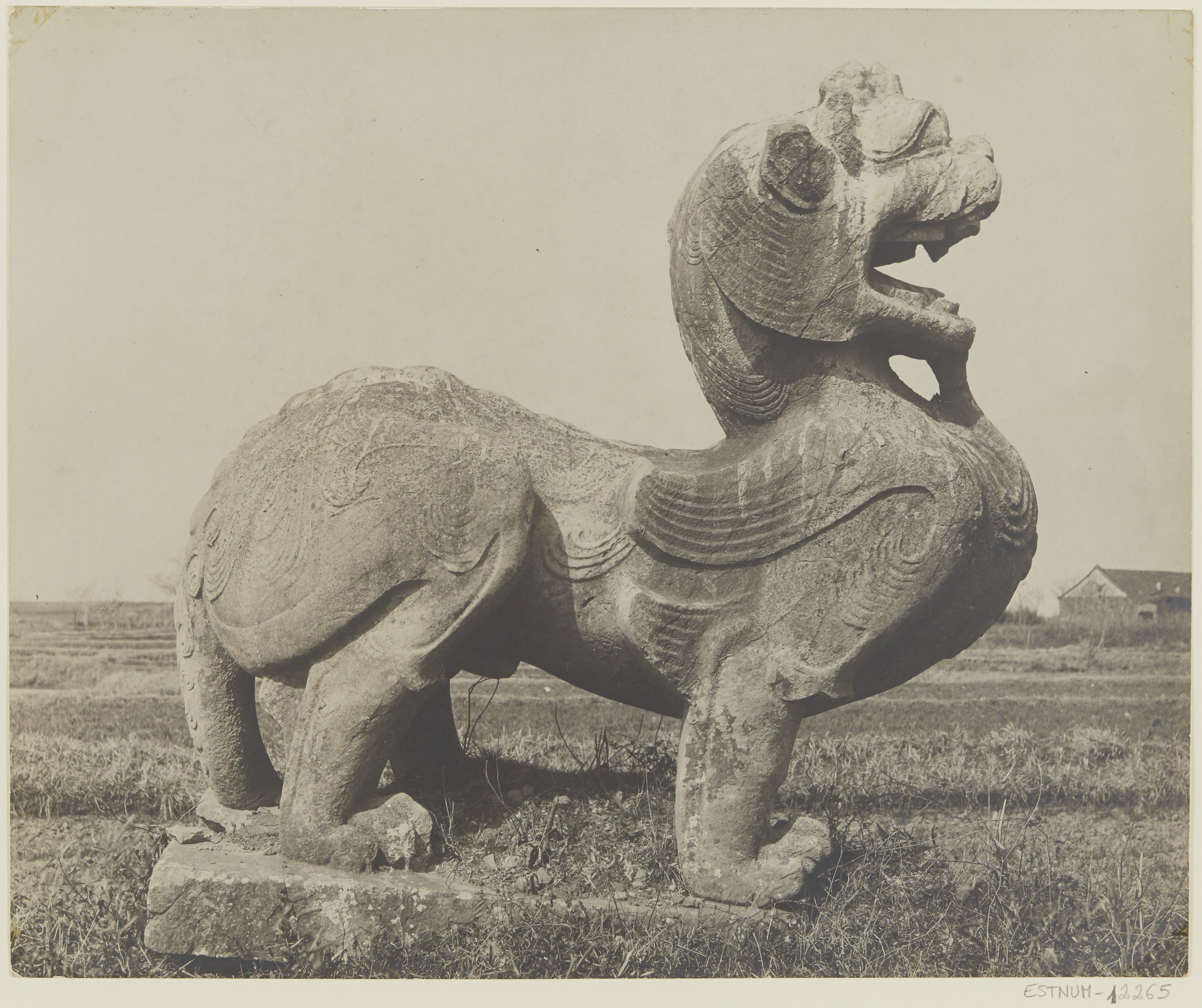
Tianlu (天禄) "Chimeras" at the tomb of Emperor Wu of Southern Qi (Xiao Ze) in Danyang

Owing to their special status under the immigrant registration system, displaced northern population in Jingkou initially enjoyed exemptions from taxes and corvée labor. In 454, the Liu Song court began taxing these communities, and the institutional role of the Northern Headquarters steadily declined, finally was abolished in 484, and in 502 the Liang government ended the remaining privileges for immigrant groups.

In 589, Sui forces crossed the Yangtze to seize Jingkou and then advanced on Jiankang, capital of the Southern dynasties. An edict ordered virtually the entire city of Jiankang to be demolished. Jiankang's status was accordingly downgraded, and for much of the period until 887, Jiankang served only as a subordinate county under Jingkou, later known as Runzhou. This shift made Runzhou the main regional administrative centre of the lower Yangtze.

The city's position was further strengthened by the Jiangnan, or Zhexi, Canal—named for the region north and west of the Qiantang River (modern southern Jiangsu and northern Zhejiang). Begun in 605 under Emperor Yang of Sui, largely along earlier waterways, this southern leg of the Grand Canal linked Jingkou with Yuhang (modern Hangzhou) and more directly connected the Yangtze Delta with northern China.

From the Tang onward, Runzhou developed into a center for handicrafts and state-supervised production. Local silk gauze (luo, 罗) remained a regular tribute item through the Song, supported by state-operated workshops. Significant regional silver production is suggested by the Dingmao Bridge (丁卯橋) hoard—containing over 900 silver objects—as well as late Tang records of silver ingot tributes, which are generally associated with state-managed metalworking in the region.

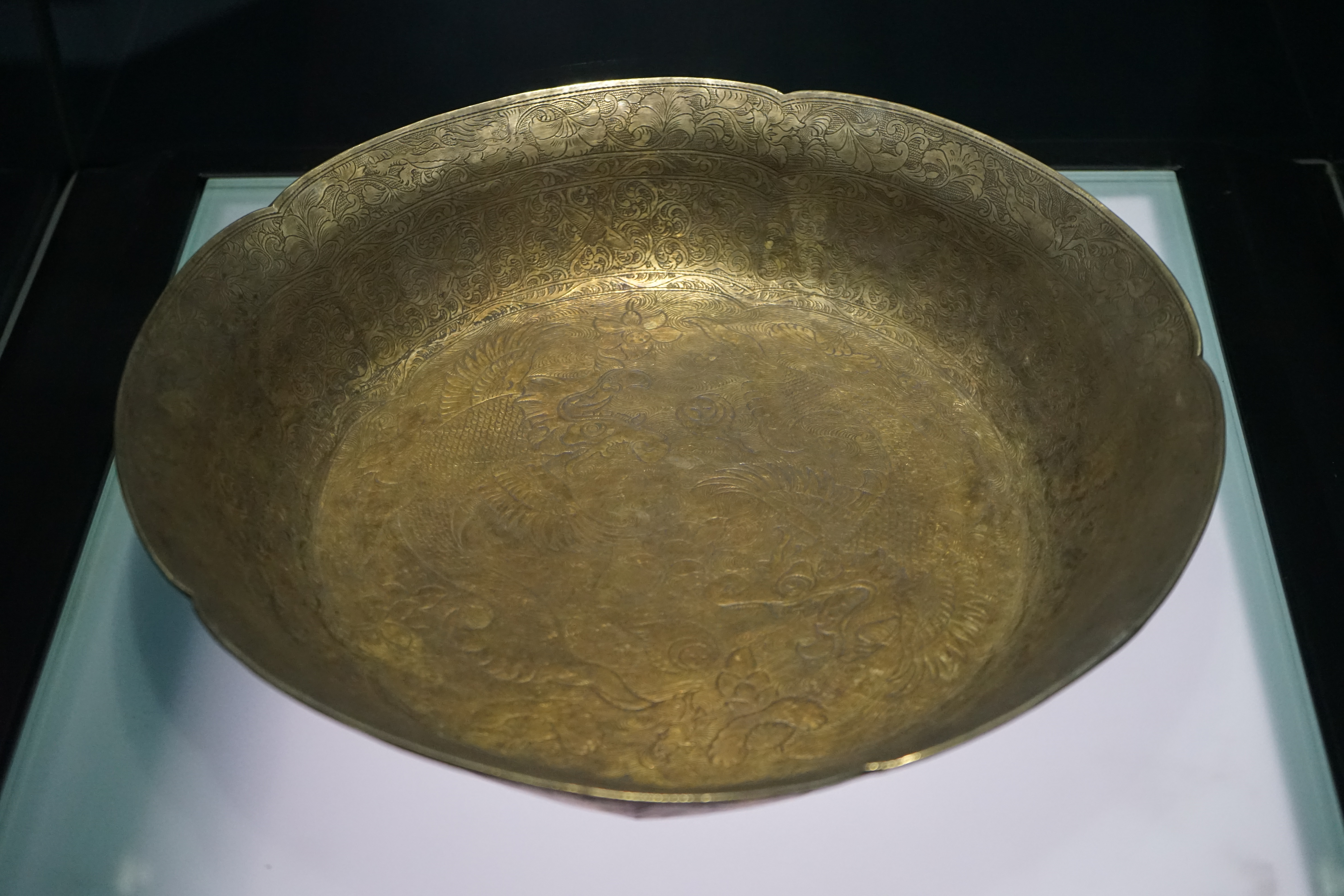
Gilt silver basin from the Dingmao Bridge hoard

=== Song to Qing dynasties ===
The city flourished from the 10th to 13th centuries, when it produced fine silks, satins, and silverware for the Song emperors. The 11th-century scientist and statesman Shen Kuo composed his 1088 Dream Pool Essays during his retirement in a garden estate on the outskirts of the city. It was taken by the Mongolians during their 1275 campaign against the Southern Song capital at Hangzhou. Under their Yuan dynasty, some Nestorian Christians were reported living in the city. The city fell to Xu Da on 17 March 1356. According to Odoric of Pordenone, Zhenjiang had a vast amount of shipping, more so than any other city in the world. The ships which worked the city were painted white and often doubled as businesses such as taverns or other gathering spots. Under the Ming, it was the seat of a prefecture (fu) of Nanzhili, the Southern Directly-Administered District around the secondary capital Nanjing. The Southern Ming placed the town under Zheng Zhifeng, brother of Zheng Zhilong and favorite uncle of Koxinga. He was fooled into wasting most of his ammunition against a feint, however, and forced to abandon the city to the Manchus on 1 June 1645.

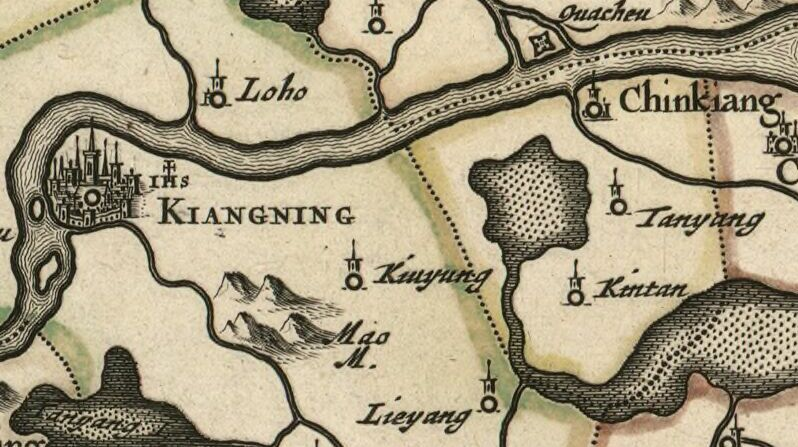
Zhenjiang Prefecture ("Chinkiang") between the Yangtze and Lake Tai east of Nanjing ("Kiangning"), from Martino Martini's 1655 Novus Atlas Sinensis. The river marked west of the city is the Grand Canal.

Under the Qing, Zhenjiang was a city of half a million surrounded by a series of brick city walls up to 35 feet (11 m) high. It continued as a prefectural seat, first under the "Right" Governor of Jiangnan at Suzhou and later under the governor of Jiangsu in Jiangning (now Nanjing). After a fierce resistance, Zhenjiang—romanized at the time as Chinkiang—was captured by the British on 21 July 1842 during the First Opium War. As this left the path open to Nanjing, its fall prompted the unequal Treaty of Nanking to avoid further conflict. A decade later, massive floods of the Yellow River altered its course from south to north of Shandong and closed the northern path of the Grand Canal. Soon after, Zhenjiang was sacked by the Taiping rebels in 1853. It was recaptured by the Qing in 1858 and opened as a treaty port in 1861. Into the 1870s, Chaozhou merchants used their connections in Zhenjiang to make it a regional distribution center for opium purchased from the foreign merchants in Shanghai; when David Sassoon attempted to avoid taxation by delivering his cargoes directly to the opium merchants in Zhenjiang, the Chinese organized to intimidate his customers and then bought out his failed organization. The population was estimated at 168,000 in 1904.

=== Modern China ===
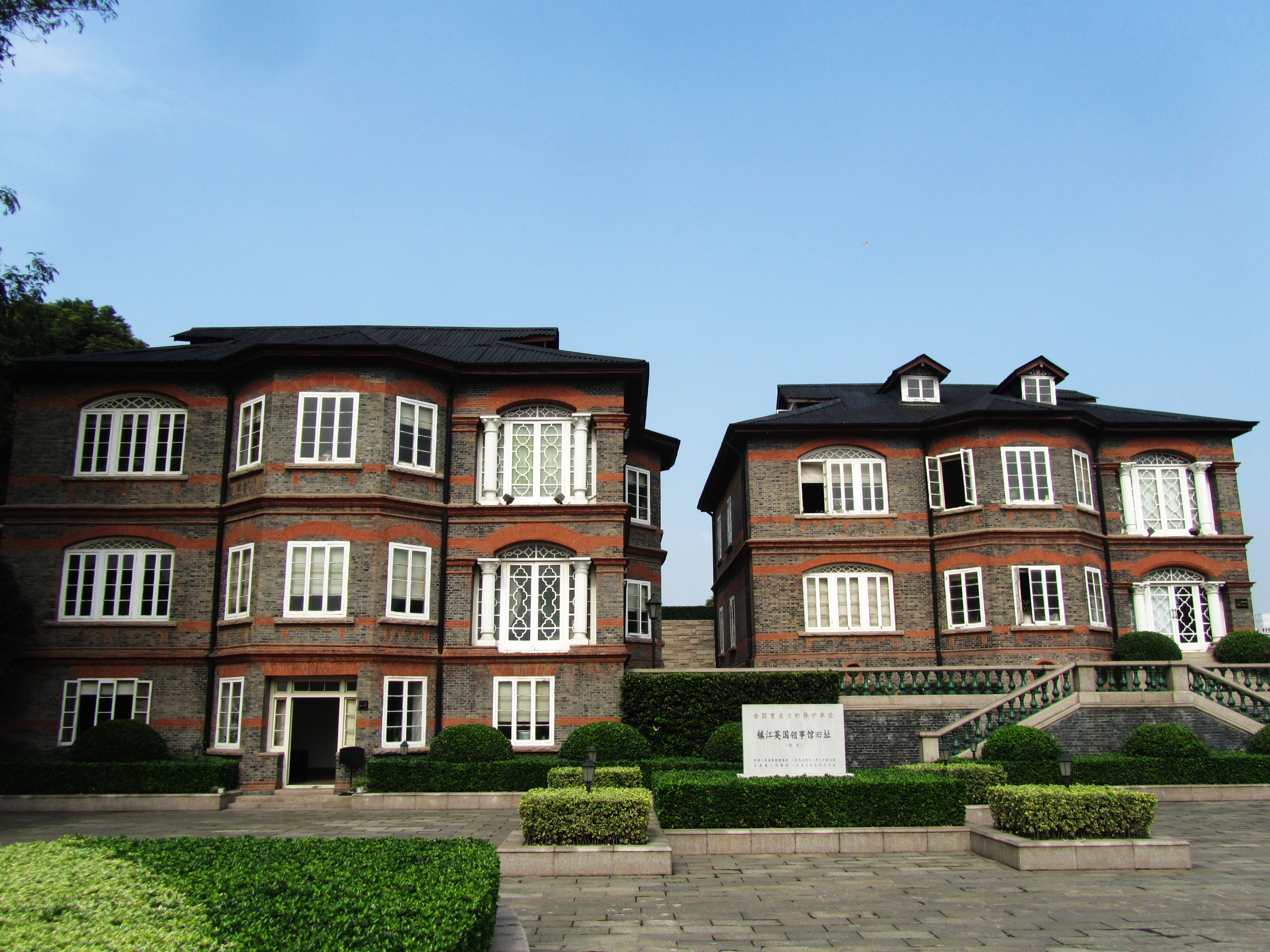
The former British consulate in Zhenjiang in 2011

The southern part of the Grand Canal was obstructed in the early 20th century, although by that point the city was connected by rail to Shanghai and Nanjing. The Kuomintang government revoked the British concession at Zhenjiang in 1929.

From 1928 to 1949, while Nanjing served as the capital of the Republic of China, Zhenjiang served as the provincial capital for Jiangsu. During World War II, the city fell to Japan's Shanghai Expeditionary Army in the morning of 8 December 1937, shortly before the capture of Nanjing, but local resistance to the Japanese is still celebrated among the Chinese. When the Communists won the Chinese Civil War and relocated the capital to Beijing, Nanjing resumed its role as Jiangsu's capital.

Zhenjiang is still one of China's busiest ports for domestic commerce, serving as a hub for trade among Jiangsu, Anhui, and Shanghai. The trade mostly consists of grain, cotton, oils, and lumber. The other main industries are mostly in the field of food processing and paper pulp manufacturing.

== Geography ==
=== Climate ===
Zhenjiang has a humid subtropical climate (Köppen: Cfa), featuring hot and uncomfortably humid summers, cold though not severe winters, a noticeable rise in rainfall during the East Asian monsoon. Extremes since 1951 have ranged from −12.0 °C (10.4 °F) (unofficial record of −12.9 °C or 8.8 °F was set on 27 January 1933) to 39.5 °C (103.1 °F).

Climate data for Zhenjiang (Dantu District) (1991–2020 normals, extremes 1955–present)
Month	Jan	Feb	Mar	Apr	May	Jun	Jul	Aug	Sep	Oct	Nov	Dec	Year
Record high °C (°F)	21.0 (69.8)	26.5 (79.7)	29.5 (85.1)	33.5 (92.3)	36.5 (97.7)	38.0 (100.4)	39.5 (103.1)	38.8 (101.8)	38.2 (100.8)	32.5 (90.5)	29.2 (84.6)	22.8 (73.0)	39.5 (103.1)
Mean daily maximum °C (°F)	7.1 (44.8)	9.7 (49.5)	14.6 (58.3)	21.0 (69.8)	26.2 (79.2)	29.0 (84.2)	32.2 (90.0)	31.7 (89.1)	27.8 (82.0)	22.6 (72.7)	16.4 (61.5)	9.8 (49.6)	20.7 (69.2)
Daily mean °C (°F)	3.2 (37.8)	5.3 (41.5)	9.8 (49.6)	15.7 (60.3)	21.1 (70.0)	24.7 (76.5)	28.2 (82.8)	27.8 (82.0)	23.6 (74.5)	18.1 (64.6)	11.8 (53.2)	5.5 (41.9)	16.2 (61.2)
Mean daily minimum °C (°F)	0.1 (32.2)	1.9 (35.4)	5.8 (42.4)	11.1 (52.0)	16.7 (62.1)	21.1 (70.0)	24.9 (76.8)	24.7 (76.5)	20.4 (68.7)	14.4 (57.9)	8.1 (46.6)	2.1 (35.8)	12.6 (54.7)
Record low °C (°F)	−12.0 (10.4)	−12.0 (10.4)	−5.6 (21.9)	−0.1 (31.8)	7.3 (45.1)	12.1 (53.8)	18.4 (65.1)	17.9 (64.2)	10.7 (51.3)	3.2 (37.8)	−4.6 (23.7)	−12.0 (10.4)	−12.0 (10.4)
Average precipitation mm (inches)	55.9 (2.20)	54.5 (2.15)	81.2 (3.20)	75.8 (2.98)	88.8 (3.50)	184.4 (7.26)	210.7 (8.30)	165.2 (6.50)	78.1 (3.07)	57.6 (2.27)	58.9 (2.32)	39.9 (1.57)	1,151 (45.32)
Average precipitation days (≥ 0.1 mm)	9.3	9.2	10.6	9.5	10.1	11.1	13.7	12.8	8.2	7.7	8.5	7.3	118
Average snowy days	3.3	2.5	0.9	0.1	0	0	0	0	0	0	0.3	1.2	8.3
Average relative humidity (%)	71	71	69	68	69	76	79	79	76	72	72	69	73
Mean monthly sunshine hours	132.1	130.5	153.6	180.7	191.9	149.0	185.5	189.8	168.9	172.8	149.2	145.1	1,949.1
Percentage possible sunshine	41	41	41	46	45	35	43	46	46	49	48	47	44
Source: China Meteorological Administration all-time extreme low all-time January high

== Administration ==
The prefecture-level city of Zhenjiang administers 6 county-level divisions, including three districts and three county-level cities.

These are further divided into 77 township-level divisions, including 66 towns, 1 township and 10 subdistricts.

Administrative divisions of Zhenjiang
Subdivision	Simplified Chinese	Hanyu Pinyin	Population (2020)	Area (km^{2})	Density (/km^{2})
City Proper
Jingkou District	京口区	Jīngkǒu Qū	619,570	426.8	1,452
Runzhou District	润州区	Rùnzhōu Qū	299,956	127.4	2,354
Suburban
Dantu District	丹徒区	Dāntú Qū	347,264	634.5	547.3
Satellite cities (County-level cities)
Danyang City	丹阳市	Dānyáng Shì	988,900	1,047	944.5
Yangzhong City	扬中市	Yángzhōng Shì	315,462	330.8	953.6
Jurong City	句容市	Jùróng Shì	639,266	1,380	463.2
Total			3,210,418	3,947	813.4

== Demographics ==
As in Nanjing, Zhenjiang's old Wu dialects have been entirely supplanted by a dialect of Lower Yangtze Mandarin. It is incomprehensible to the residents of neighboring Changzhou, whose dialect remains a form of Taihu Wu.

The population was 3,210,418 as of 2020, reflecting a 0.31% annual change from the 2010 census, which recorded a population of 3,114,105.

== Culture ==
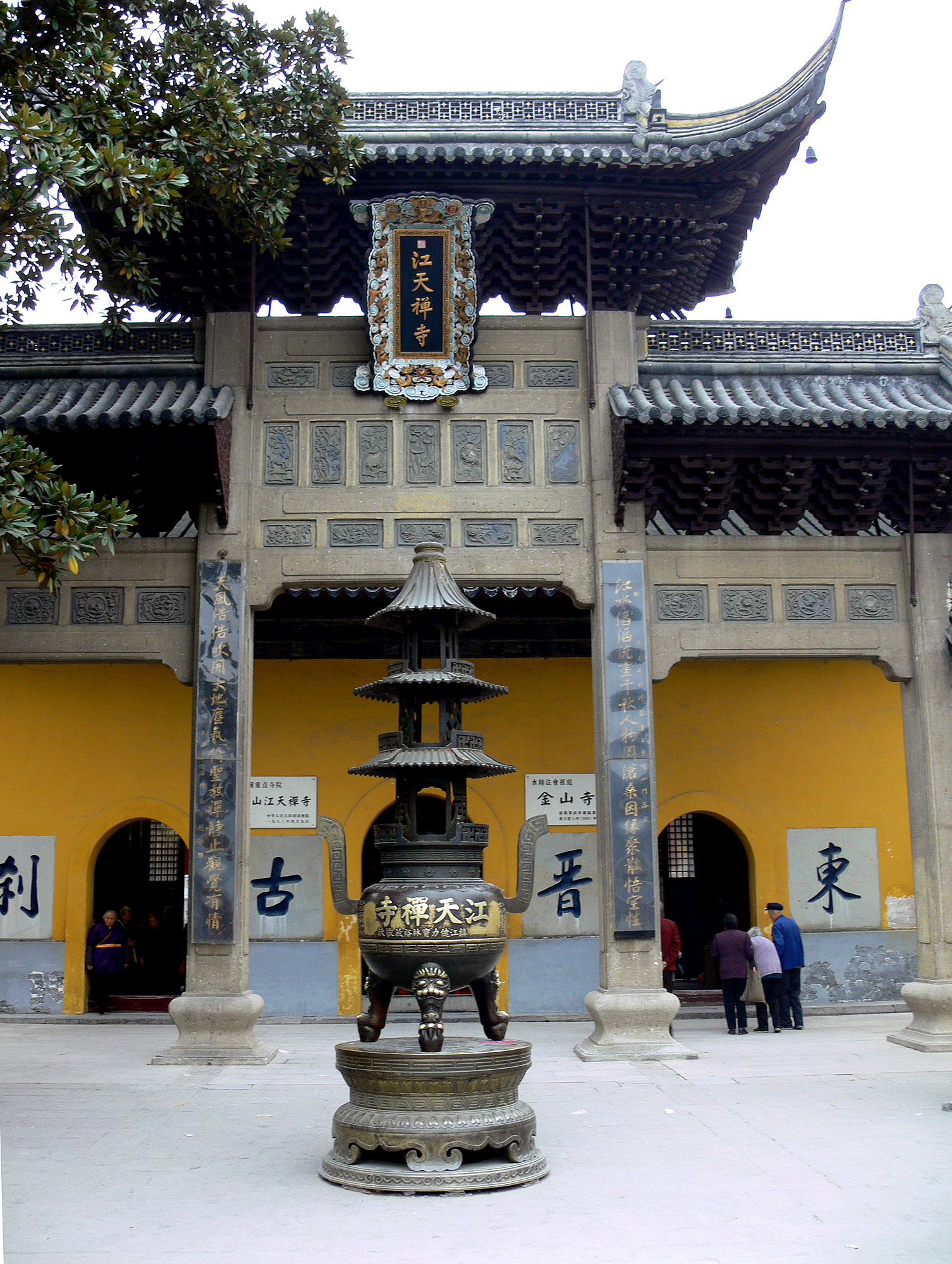
The Jinshan Temple

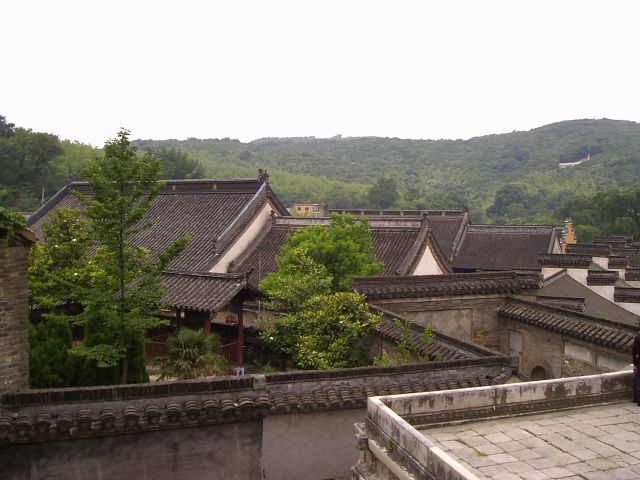
The roof of Longchang Temple

Zhenjiang is most famous for its fragrant black vinegar, called Zhenjiang vinegar. Chinese legend traces it to Heita, the son of Dukang, the supposed inventor of alcoholic beverages. Having forgotten about a vat of wine for 21 days, he found it had spoiled but now possessed a pleasant sour taste that could be used to complement foods. The present recipe is said to date back 1400 years, with its major modern manufacturer—the Jiangsu Hengshun Vinegar Industry Co.—dating to 1840.

Other local specialties include crab cream bun, Chinkiang pork (鎭江肴肉, akin to head cheese), and pickled vegetables. Formerly, households in Zhenjiang would prepare for the new year by eating a red-bean dish and avoiding rice. One bowl of beans was left on the table to feed the home's flies, from the belief that they would then avoid disturbing the family during the new year festivities.

A natural spring in a park on the edge of Zhenjiang has been famed since the Tang (7th–9th century) as the best in Jiangsu for making tea. It is now marketed as the "First Spring under Heaven".

The 15th-century Japanese ink-wash master Sesshū Tōyō studied in Zhenjiang.

The local Jinshan temple appears in the tale of Madame White Snake and inspired a replica in the Kangxi Emperor's garden at Chengde.

== Transport ==
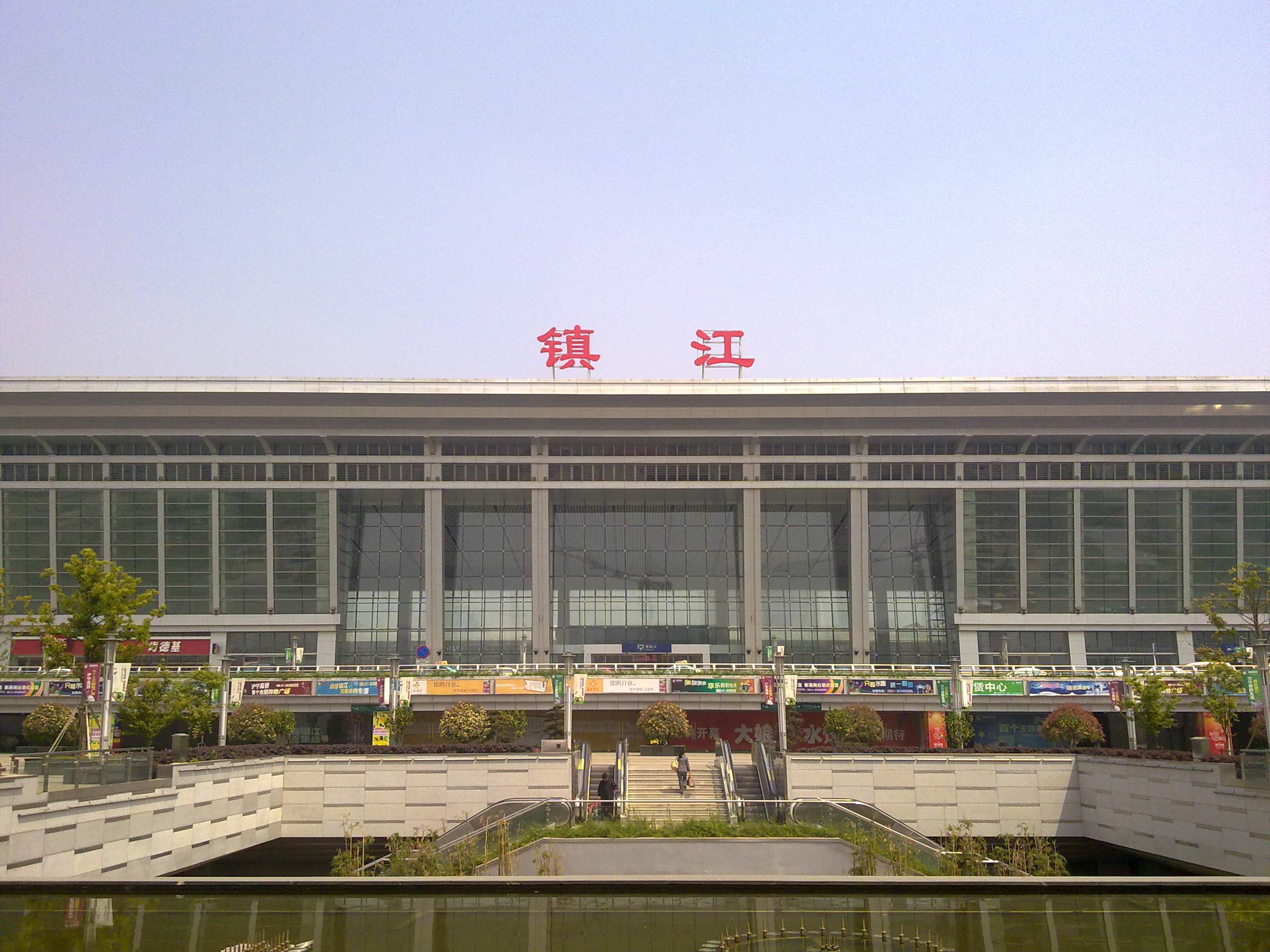
The new Zhenjiang Railway Station

Zhenjiang is located in the convenient Yangtze River Delta transport corridor, at the crossroads of the Grand Canal and the Yangtze, and between the Shanghai and Nanjing economic regions. The Port of Zhenjiang is the third largest port on the Yangtze. The city has two Yangtze River crossings. The Runyang Yangtze River Bridge complex, which has one of the longest suspension bridge spans in the world, connects to Yangzhou. The Taizhou Yangtze River Bridge, one of the longest cable-stayed bridges in the world, connects Yongzhong with Taizhou.

=== Rail ===
Zhenjiang has been connected by rail since 1906, at the completion of the Nanjing-Shanghai Railway. The railway was extended to Beijing after the completion of the Nanjing Yangtze River Bridge in 1968, connecting Zhenjiang to China's political and commercial hubs. The primary railway station was Zhenjiang West Railway Station, which was demolished in 2004 due to congestion it caused in the city center. Since then Zhenjiang Railway Station has served as the city's principal railway station.

==== High-speed rail ====
Since April 2010, Zhenjiang has been on the route of the Shanghai-Nanjing Intercity Rail, the first high-speed rail with a design speed of over 300 km/h (186 mph) to serve the city. In 2011, the Beijing–Shanghai High-Speed Railway was completed. Trains on the line stop at Zhenjiang South Railway Station. The two high-speed lines have reduced travel time between Zhenjiang and Shanghai to under an hour, and travel time to Beijing to under five hours. Rail service to Shanghai is frequent – averaging one train in less than half an hour.

=== Air ===
Zhenjiang does not have a commercial airport within its city limits, although there is a military airfield, Zhenjiang Dalu General Airport (镇江大路机场), which may open to regional flights in the future. Zhenjiang city center is 62 km (39 mi) away from Changzhou Benniu International Airport, about a one-hour drive (80 km or 50 mi) away from Nanjing Lukou International Airport via Nanjing Provincial Highway 243, and approximately a two-hour (143 km or 89 mi) drive away from Sunan Shuofang International Airport. Check-in facilities are available for Lukou Airport in the New Zhenjiang Bus Station (镇江汽车新站).

=== Roadways ===
Zhenjiang is on the route of Beijing-Shanghai Expressway, and China National Highway 312.

=== Public transport ===
As of 2014, Zhenjiang had an extensive number of bus routes – numbering nearly one hundred. Since 2012 the city's entire fleet of city buses are equipped with GPS and are managed centrally through a "smart transport network system."

== Industry ==
Zhenjiang Export Processing Zone was approved by the State Council on March 10, 2003, with a total planned area of 2.53 square kilometres (0.98 square miles). The first-phrase project completed in December 2003 covers 0.91 square kilometres (0.35 square miles) and was certified by the Customs General Administration and other seven ministries for operation on December 24, 2003. Zhenjiang Export Processing Zone is located close to Changzhou Airport and Zhenjiang Port.

== Education ==
As of 2025, Zhenjiang is a major city for scientific research, appearing among the world's top 100 cities as tracked by the Nature Index.

Public institutions having full-time Bachelor's degree programs include Jiangsu University (江苏大学) and the Jiangsu University of Science and Technology (江苏科技大学). Zhenjiang is home to the Silkworm Raising Research Institute of the Academy of Agricultural Science of China. The Shaozong Library includes a 100-volume collection of sayings and proverbs dating from the 7th to 11th centuries.

Senior high schools are Jiangsu Provincial Zhenjiang No. 1 High School (江苏省镇江第一中学), the Zhenjiang High School of Jiangsu Province (江苏省镇江中学) and the Jiangsu Provincial Dagang High School (江苏省大港中学).

== Notable people ==
- Bao Guancheng (1898–1975), Manchukuo politician
- Bao Rong, poet of the Tang dynasty
- John Lossing Buck (1890–1975), American agricultural economist
- Pearl S. Buck, also known as Sai Zhenzhu (Chinese: 賽珍珠, 1892–1973), Nobel Prize-winning author of The Good Earth and other novels about China, lived in Zhenjiang with her missionary parents until the age of 18.
- Chen Ling (born 1987), archer
- Du Jin (c.1465–1509), painter
- Duan Zhengcheng (1934–2020), industrial engineer and inventor
- Fan Xiaojun (born 1956), general of the Chinese People's Liberation Army Air Force
- John Calvin Ferguson (1866–1945), American scholar of Chinese art
- Ge Fei (born 1964), author
- Ge Hong (283– 343 or 364) linguist, philosopher, physician, politician
- He Shuangqing (1715 – c.1737), poet who lived during the Qing dynasty
- He Zhi (264–280), official of the state of Eastern Wu
- Hu Mingfei (born 1993), footballer
- Hu Peng (born 1989), powerlifter
- Huang Shuxian (born 1954), politician
- Charles Judd (1842–1919), British missionary
- Kwang Pu Chen (1880–1976), banker and State Councillor
- Li Lanqing (born 1933), former vice premier of China
- Li Pei (1917–2017), linguist and English professor
- Li Ruofan (born 1978), chess player
- Li Yaguang (born 1958), basketballer
- Lin Jiamei (born 1924), widow of former Chinese president Li Xiannian
- Liu Jie (born 1970), politician
- Liu Xie (c.465-522), monk, politician, and writer
- Liu Xin (born 1975), television host
- Liu Xiaoming (born 1964), politician
- Liu Chuanzhi (born 1944), founder of Lenovo
- Liu E (1857–1909), late Qing dynasty writer
- Lu Maozeng (1928–2022), wheat breeding expert and politician
- Lü Shuxiang (1904–1998), linguist and lexicographer
- Ma Jianzhong (1845–1900), official and scholar in the late Qing dynasty
- Ma Weiming (born 1960), naval and electrical engineer known for contributions to the Chinese aircraft carrier programme
- Ma Xiangbo (1840–1939), former Jesuit priest, scholar
- Mao Yisheng (1896–1989), structural engineer and social activist
- William David Rudland (1839–1912), English Christian evangelist
- Theodor Schjøth (1890–1932), Norwegian rower
- Shen Kuo (1031–1095), Song dynasty Scientist
- Shi Zhengrong (born 1963), businessman and philanthropist
- Si Guo (1918–2004), English name Frederick Tsai, essayist and translator who worked in Hong Kong for most of his career
- Song Yue (born 1991), footballer
- Sun Ce (175-200), military general and politician
- Tang Jiaxuan (born 1938), diplomat and politician
- Hudson Taylor (1832–1905), British Missionary, Buried in Zhenjiang
- Maria Jane Taylor (1837–1870), British Missionary
- Tong Yuanming (born 1972), chess player
- Wang Fulin (born 1931), television director and producer
- Wei Wei (1922–2023), film actress
- Wei Zhao (204–273), official, historian, and scholar of the state of Eastern Wu
- Emperor Wen of Song (407-453), emperor of the Liu Song dynasty
- Emperor Wu of Song (363-422), founding emperor of the Liu Song dynasty.
- Wu Wenjin (born 1976), chess Grandmaster
- Xiao Pei (born 1961), editor and politician
- Empress Dowager Xiaoyi (1397–1462), concubine of the Xuande Emperor
- Xu Juan (born 1981), goalball player
- Xue Song (born 1994), badminton player
- Ye Xiushan (1935–2016), philosopher, aestheticist and Chinese Opera theorist
- Yin Fanglong (born 1953), general of the Chinese People's Liberation Army
- Yu Xie (born 1959), Chinese-American sociologist
- Yu Yunyao (born 1941), politician
- Zhang Junxiang (1910–1996), film director and playwright
- Zhang Yin (1761–1829), painter
- Zhang Zhaohuan (1925–2005), physician and biostatistician
- Zhou Kunren (born 1937), politician
- Zhou Wenju (942–961), painter

== Twin towns – sister cities ==
- Fairfield, Australia
- Mannheim, Germany
- Kiskőrös, Hungary
- Tsu, Mie, Japan
- Kuching, Malaysia
- Stavropol, Russia
- Tempe, Arizona, United States

== See also ==
- List of twin towns and sister cities in China
