= John Stewart Bell =

Northern Irish physicist (1928–1990)

John Stewart Bell FRS
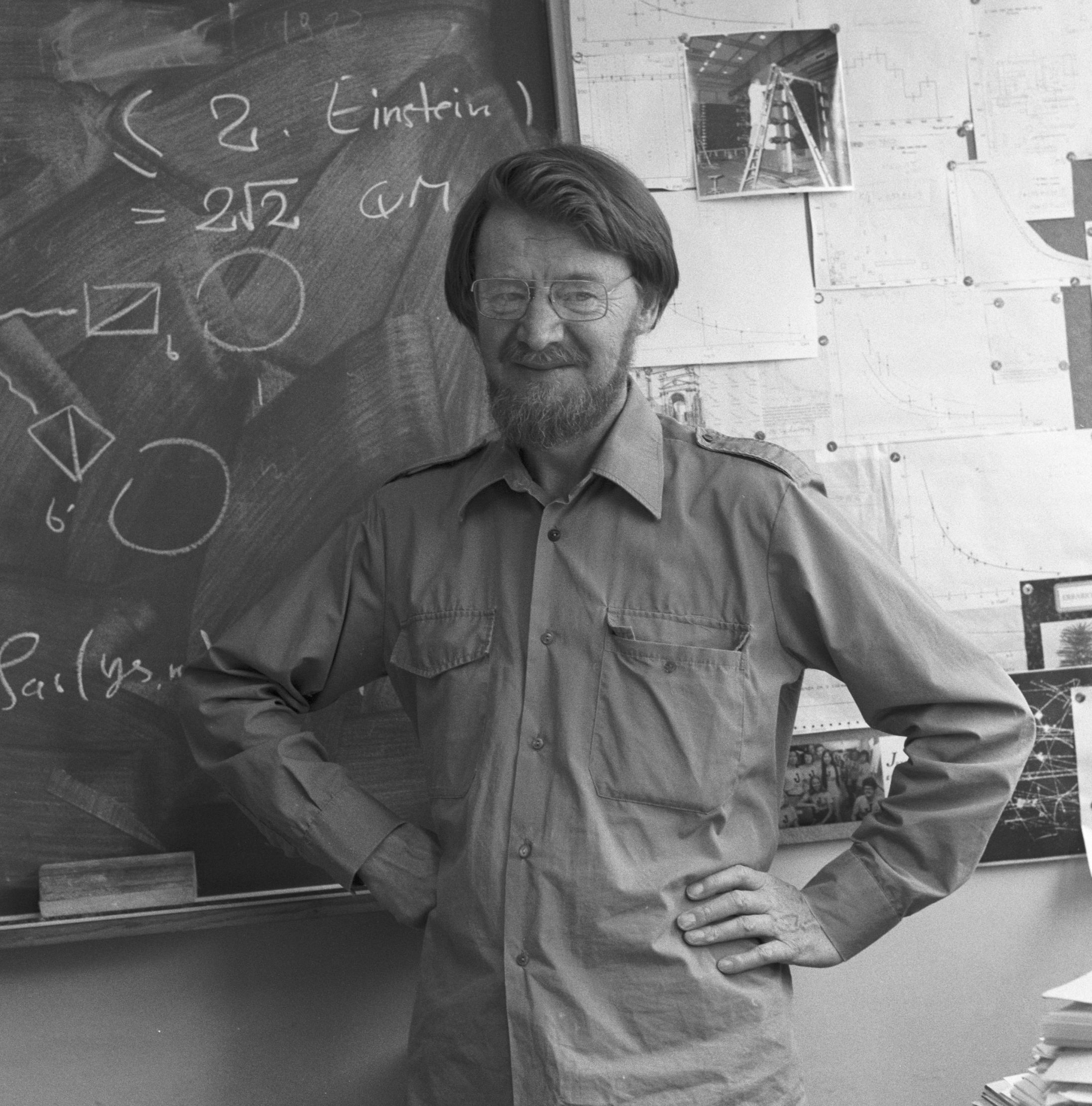
- Bell in 1982
- Born: John Stewart Bell; 28 July 1928; Belfast, Northern Ireland, UK
- Died: 1 October 1990 (aged 62); Geneva, Switzerland
- Education: Queen's University of Belfast (BSc); University of Birmingham (PhD)
- Known for: Bell's theorem Bell state Bell's spaceship paradox Bell–Kochen–Specker theorem Chiral anomaly CPT symmetry Superdeterminism; Quantum entanglement
- Awards: Heineman Prize (1989); Hughes Medal (1989); Paul Dirac Medal and Prize (1988)
- Scientific career
- Workplaces: Atomic Energy Research Establishment; CERN, Stanford University
- Thesis: Contribution to field theory (i. Time reversal in field theory, ii. Some functional methods in field theory.) (1956)
- Doctoral advisor: Rudolph E. Peierls
- Other academic advisors: Paul Taunton Matthews

John Stewart Bell (28 July 1928 – 1 October 1990) was a physicist from Northern Ireland and the originator of Bell's theorem, an important theorem in quantum physics regarding hidden-variable theories.

In 2022, the Nobel Prize in Physics was awarded to Alain Aspect, John Clauser, and Anton Zeilinger for work on Bell inequalities and the experimental validation of Bell's theorem.

== Biography ==
=== Early life and work ===
Bell was born in Belfast, Northern Ireland to a Scottish working class family. Due to financial hardship, neither parent and none of his three older siblings completed high school, typically dropping out of school by age 14 to work. When he was 11 years old, he decided to be a scientist, and encouraged by his mother, at 16 he graduated from Belfast Technical High School. Then in an exceptionally rare occurrence for someone of his background, Bell attended the Queen's University of Belfast, where, in 1948, he obtained a bachelor's degree in experimental physics and, a year later, a bachelor's degree in mathematical physics. He went on to complete a PhD in physics at the University of Birmingham in 1956, specialising in nuclear physics and quantum field theory. In 1954, he married Mary Ross, also a physicist, whom he had met while working on accelerator physics at Malvern, UK. Bell became a vegetarian in his teen years. According to his wife, Bell was an atheist.

Bell's career began with the UK Atomic Energy Research Establishment, near Harwell, Oxfordshire, known as AERE or Harwell Laboratory. In 1960, he moved to work for the European Organization for Nuclear Research (CERN, Conseil Européen pour la Recherche Nucléaire), in Geneva, Switzerland. There he worked almost exclusively on theoretical particle physics and on accelerator design, but found time to pursue a major avocation, investigating the foundations of quantum theory. He was elected a Foreign Honorary Member of the American Academy of Arts and Sciences in 1987. Also of significance during his career, Bell, together with John Bradbury Sykes, M. J. Kearsley, and W. H. Reid, translated several volumes of the ten-volume Course of Theoretical Physics of Lev Landau and Evgeny Lifshitz, making these works available to an English-speaking audience in translation, all of which remain in print.

Bell was a proponent of pilot wave theory. In 1987, inspired by Ghirardi–Rimini–Weber theory, he also advocated collapse theories. He said about the interpretation of quantum mechanics: "Well, you see, I don't really know. For me it's not something where I have a solution to sell!"

=== Critique of von Neumann's proof ===
Bell was impressed that the formulation of David Bohm's nonlocal hidden-variable theory did not require a "movable boundary" between the quantum system and the classical apparatus:

A possibility is that we find exactly where the boundary lies. More plausible to me is that we will find that there is no boundary. ... The wave functions would prove to be a provisional or incomplete description of the quantum-mechanical part, of which an objective account would become possible. It is this possibility, of a homogeneous account of the world, which is for me the chief motivation of the study of the so-called "hidden variable" possibility.

Bell also criticized the standard formalism of quantum mechanics on the grounds of lack of physical precision:

For the good books known to me are not much concerned with physical precision. This is clear already from their vocabulary. Here are some words which, however legitimate and necessary in application, have no place in a formulation with any pretension to physical precision: system, apparatus, environment, microscopic, macroscopic, reversible, irreversible, observable, information, measurement. ... On this list of bad words from good books, the worst of all is "measurement".

To thoroughly explore the viability of Bohm's theory, Bell needed to answer the challenge of the so-called impossibility proofs against hidden variables. Bell addressed these in a paper entitled "On the Problem of Hidden Variables in Quantum Mechanics". (Due to publishing delays, this paper did not appear until 1966, two years after his more famous work on the Einstein–Podolsky–Rosen (EPR) paradox.) He showed that John von Neumann's no hidden variables proof does not prove the impossibility of hidden variables, as was widely claimed, due to its reliance on a physical assumption that is not valid for quantum mechanics – namely, that the probability-weighted average of the sum of observable quantities equals the sum of the average values of each of the separate observable quantities. This flaw in von Neumann's proof had been previously discovered by Grete Hermann in 1935, but did not become common knowledge until after it was rediscovered by Bell. Bell reportedly said, "The proof of von Neumann is not merely false but foolish!" In this same work, Bell showed that a stronger effort at such a proof (based upon Gleason's theorem) also fails to eliminate the hidden-variables program.

However, in 2010, Jeffrey Bub published an argument that Bell (and, implicitly, Hermann) had misconstrued von Neumann's proof, saying that it does not attempt to prove the absolute impossibility of hidden variables, and is actually not flawed, after all. (Thus, it was the physics community as a whole that had misinterpreted von Neumann's proof as applying universally.) Bub provides evidence that von Neumann understood the limits of his proof, but there is no record of von Neumann attempting to correct the near universal misinterpretation which lingered for over 30 years and exists to some extent to this day. Von Neumann's proof does not in fact apply to contextual hidden variables, as in Bohm's theory. Bub's conclusion has, in turn, been questioned.

=== Bell's theorem ===
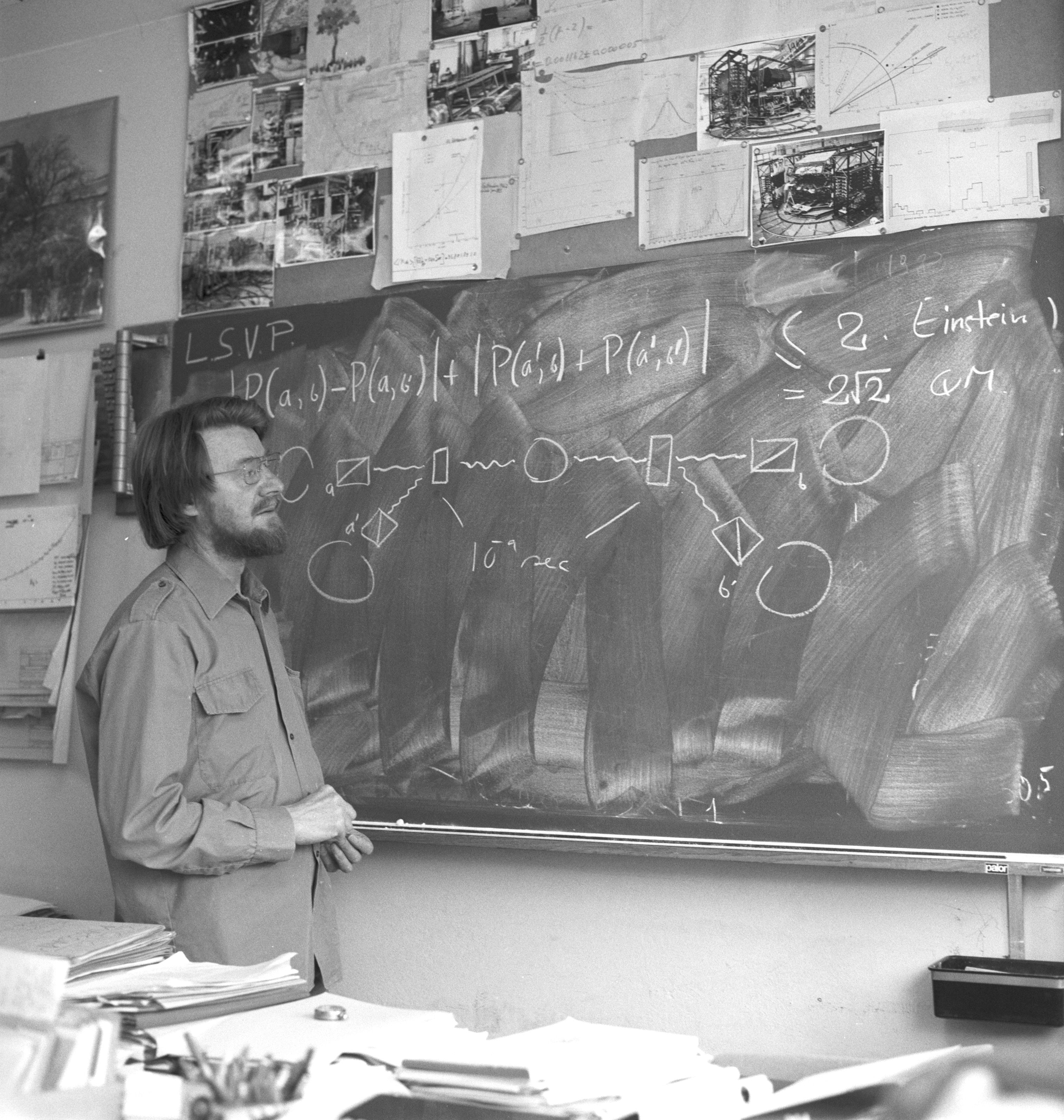
Bell discussing Bell's inequality at CERN in 1982

In 1964, after a year's leave from CERN that he spent at Stanford University, the University of Wisconsin–Madison and Brandeis University, Bell wrote a paper entitled "On the Einstein–Podolsky–Rosen paradox". In this work, he showed that carrying forward EPR's analysis permits one to derive the famous Bell's theorem. The resultant inequality, derived from basic assumptions that apply to all classical situations, is violated by quantum theory.

=== Conclusions from experimental tests ===
In 1972 an experiment was conducted that, when extrapolated to ideal detector efficiencies, showed a violation of Bell's inequality. It was the first of many such experiments. Bell himself concluded from these experiments that "It now seems that the non-locality is deeply rooted in quantum mechanics itself and will persist in any completion." This, according to Bell, also implied that quantum theory is not locally causal and cannot be embedded into any locally causal theory. Bell regretted that results of the tests did not agree with the concept of local hidden variables:

For me, it is so reasonable to assume that the photons in those experiments carry with them programs, which have been correlated in advance, telling them how to behave. This is so rational that I think that when Einstein saw that, and the others refused to see it, he was the rational man. The other people, although history has justified them, were burying their heads in the sand. ... So for me, it is a pity that Einstein's idea doesn't work. The reasonable thing just doesn't work."

Bell seemed to have become resigned to the notion that future experiments would continue to agree with quantum mechanics and violate his inequality. Referring to the Bell test experiments, he remarked:

It is difficult for me to believe that quantum mechanics, working very well for currently practical set-ups, will nevertheless fail badly with improvements in counter efficiency ..."

Some people continue to believe that agreement with Bell's inequalities might yet be saved. They argue that in the future much more precise experiments could reveal that one of the known loopholes, for example the so-called "fair sampling loophole", had been biasing the interpretations. Most mainstream physicists are highly sceptical about all these "loopholes", admitting their existence but continuing to believe that Bell's inequalities must fail.

Bell remained interested in objective "observer-free" quantum mechanics. He felt that at the most fundamental level, physical theories ought not to be concerned with observables, but with "beables" – "The beables of the theory are those elements which might correspond to elements of reality, to things which exist. Their existence does not depend on 'observation'." He remained impressed with Bohm's hidden variables as an example of such a scheme, and he attacked the more subjective alternatives such as the Copenhagen interpretation.

=== Teaching special theory of relativity ===
Bell and his wife, Mary Ross Bell, also a physicist, contributed substantially to the physics of particle accelerators, and with numerous young theorists at CERN, Bell developed particle physics itself. An overview of this work is available in the volume of collected works edited by Mary Bell, Kurt Gottfried, and Martinus Veltman. Apart from his particle physics research, Bell often raised an issue of special relativity comprehension, and although there is only one written report on this topic available ("How to teach special relativity"), this was a critical subject to him. Bell admired Einstein's contribution to special relativity, but warned in 1985 "Einstein's approach is ... pedagogically dangerous, in my opinion". In 1989 on the occasion of the centenary of the Lorentz-FitzGerald body contraction Bell writes "A great deal of nonsense has been written about the FitzGerald contraction". Bell preferred to think of Lorentz-FitzGerald contraction as a phenomenon that is real and observable as a property of a material body, which was also Einstein's opinion, but in Bell's view Einstein's approach leaves a lot of room for misinterpretation. This situation and the background of Bell's position is described in detail by his collaborator Johann Rafelski in the textbook "Relativity Matters" (2017). In order to combat misconceptions surrounding Lorentz-FitzGerald body contraction Bell adapted and promoted a relativistic thought experiment which became widely known as Bell's spaceship paradox.

=== Death ===
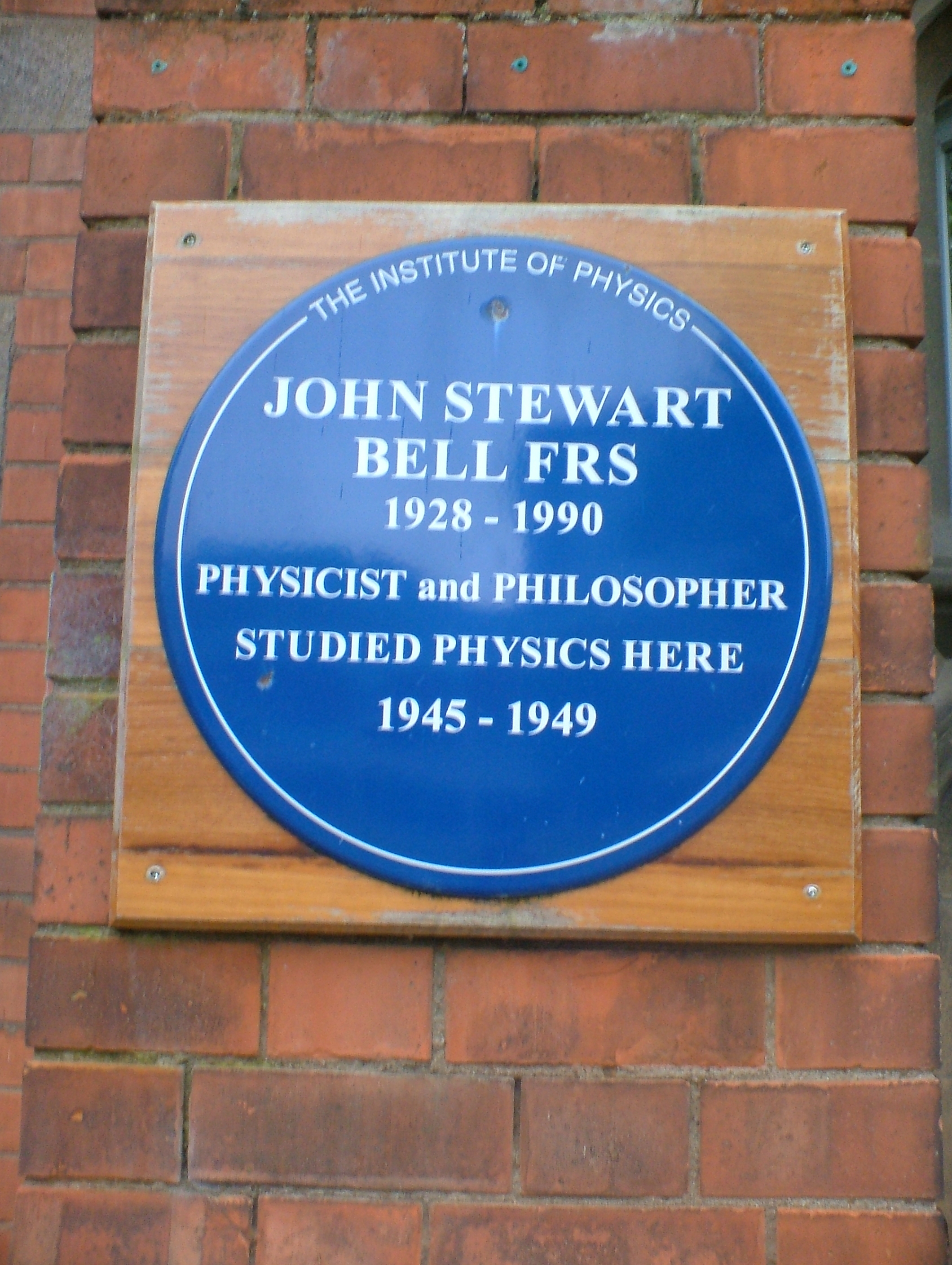
Blue plaque honouring John Bell at the Queen's University of Belfast

Bell died unexpectedly of a cerebral hemorrhage in Geneva in 1990. Unknown to Bell, he had reportedly been nominated for a Nobel Prize that year.

== Legacy ==
- In 2008, the John Stewart Bell Prize was created by the Centre for Quantum Information and Quantum Control at the University of Toronto. The prize is awarded every other year for significant contributions first published during the six preceding years. The award recognizes major advances relating to the foundations of quantum mechanics and to the applications of these principles. In 2009, the first award was presented by Alain Aspect to Nicolas Gisin for his theoretical and experimental work on foundations and applications of quantum physics — notably quantum nonlocality, quantum cryptography, and quantum teleportation.
- At the CERN site in Meyrin, close to Geneva, there is a street called Route Bell in honour of John Stewart Bell.
- In 2016, his colleague from CERN, Reinhold Bertlmann, wrote a lengthy piece, "Bell's Universe: A Personal Recollection", explaining in some detail his amazement at finding out about Bell's paper on Bertlmann's socks, in which Bell compared the EPR paradox with socks.
- A day was named after him, referring to the date he released Bell's Theorem, 4 November.

=== Northern Ireland ===
- Since 2015, a street has been named "Bell's Theorem Crescent" in his city of birth, Belfast.
- The John Bell House, named in his honour, finished construction in 2016 and houses over 400 students in Belfast city centre.
- The pedestrian entrance to the Olympia leisure centre in Belfast located 200 meters from Bell's childhood home is named the "John Stewart Bell Entrance" in honour of the local man.
- In the Queen's University of Belfast one of the Physics lecture theatres is named in honour of John Stewart Bell.
- There is a blue plaque commemorating John Stewart Bell in Queen's University of Belfast main campus
- There is a blue plaque commemorating John Stewart Bell at his childhood home in Tates Avenue in Belfast
- In 2017 the Institute of Physics commissioned classical composer Matthew Whiteside's Quartet No 4 (Entangled) to be performed at the 2018 NI Science Festival inspired by Bell's work; the piece went on to become the title track on Whiteside's second album and was the inspiration for a short film by Marisa Zanotti.

== Books ==
- Bell, John Stewart (2004). Speakable and Unspeakable in Quantum Mechanics (2nd ed.). Cambridge: Cambridge University Press. ISBN 978-0-521-52338-7. 2004 edition with introduction by Alain Aspect and two additional papers: ISBN 0-521-52338-9.

== See also ==
- Epistemological Letters
- EPR paradox, a thought experiment by Einstein, Podolsky, and Rosen published in 1935
- Local hidden-variable theory
- Quantum entanglement
- Bell's theorem, published in 1964
- Bell state
- Bell test experiments
- CHSH inequality, an experiment-practical formulation of Bell's theorem
- GHZ experiment
- Superdeterminism

Other work by Bell:

- Adler–Bell–Jackiw anomaly, also known as the chiral or Axial anomaly.
- Bell's spaceship paradox
