= Zhenjiang dialect =

- On this map of Jiangsu Province, Zhenjiang is shown in red. The bullet shows the position of Nanjing.
- Chinese: 镇江话
Transcriptions
Standard Mandarin
- Hanyu Pinyin: Zhènjiāng huà
- Wade–Giles: Chen-chiang hua

The Zhenjiang dialect is a form of Eastern Mandarin spoken in the town of Zhenjiang in Jiangsu Province, China. Zhenjiang is situated on the south bank of the Yangtze river between Nanjing and Changzhou. It is thus at the intersection of China's Mandarin and Wu speaking regions. About 2.7 million Chinese live in the area where the Zhenjiang dialect is predominant.

In ancient times, Zhenjiang spoke Wu. Today, Wu is the language of nearby Changzhou, as well as Shanghai and Zhejiang Province. Mandarin speakers from the north have been immigrating to Zhenjiang since the fourth century, gradually changing the character of the local dialect. In modern times, the city speaks a dialect that is transitional between the Eastern Mandarin of Nanjing, located just west of the city, and the Taihu dialect of Wu spoken in Changzhou, which is just east of the city. The Zhenjiang dialect is comprehensible to Nanjing residents, but not to Changzhou residents.

The issue of tones in the Zhenjiang dialect has been a topic of scholarly study. Nanjing residents use the four tones of Mandarin, while Changzhou residents use seven or eight tones. According to a study by Qiu Chunan, the Zhenjiang dialect has five citation tones: Tone 1 (42) (a sharp fall from pitch 4 to pitch 2, or yinping), Tone 2 (35) (a rising tone or yangping), Tone 3 (32) (slight falling tone or shang), Tone 4 (55) (high even or qu), and Tone 5 (5) (checked tone or ru). Qiu's study used residents who had grown up in the Daxi Road area, where the standard form of the dialect is said to be spoken. The checked tone was a feature of Chinese spoken in the Middle Ages, but it is not part of Mandarin. Applying the theory of government phonology to the issue, Bao Zhiming noted that non-even tones become even when they appear before the high even, or 55, tone.
