= Si Guo =

Chinese translator (1918–2004)

Si Guo (Chinese: 思果; Jyutping: Si Gwo; 10 June 1918 – 8 June 2004) is the pen name of "Frederick" Tsai Chuo-tang (Chinese: 蔡濯堂; pinyin: Caì Zhuótáng), a Chinese translator most active between the 1940s and 1970s.

== Biography ==
Born in Zhenjiang, Cai came to Hong Kong in the late 1940s and worked as an editor at various organizations, including the Catholic weekly Kung Kao Po and the Chinese-language edition of Reader's Digest. A devout Catholic, he also served as Professor of Chinese at the Holy Spirit Seminary. After migrating to the United States in 1971, he made frequent and long visits to Hong Kong and continued to publish locally. His body of work includes over 20 collections of essays, and close to a dozen translations of books from English to Chinese.

For his work as an essayist, Tsai won the 1979 award for outstanding academic and literary publications from the Chungshan Cultural Foundation of Taiwan. His highly praised Chinese translation of the Charles Dickens novel David Copperfield was finished at the Chinese University of Hong Kong, where he was a visiting fellow in the late 1970s, and was awarded the prestigious Translation Award by the Cultural Promotion Foundation of the Taiwanese government in 1996. His series of books written on the art of translation are studied by students of translation, and often adopted as text books by the universities. Si Guo is remembered and beloved as one of China's best modern essayists.

His most popular works include Collections on Flowers (看花集) (1976), Linju Bihua (林居筆話) (1979) and Autumn in Hong Kong (香港之秋) (1980).
