= William David Rudland =

- Protestant Missionary to China
- Born: February 1839; Harston, Cambridge, England
- Died: January 1912; Taizhou, Zhejiang Province, China
- Resting place: Taizhou, China
- Other names: LU, Hui Li
- Title: Reverend
- Spouses: Mary Bell; Elizabeth Ellen Brealey; Annie Knight
- Children: Ebenezer, Mary, Mary, Grace, Charles, Wallace, Adeline

Reverend William David Rudland (1839–1912) was a Christian Evangelist from Cambridge, England, and pioneering member of the China Inland Mission. Described as a man of intense purpose, Reverend Rudland brought simplicity, humility, and a focus on realism to those he met. Rising above a difficult beginning, he pragmatically tackled obstacles keeping his focus on stretching his hand out in friendship to the Chinese people. His organization, supervision, and a firm belief in native ministry built a single church in Taizhou, Zhejiang, China, into thirty-one outstations and baptized almost two thousand converts in twenty-eight years. He translated the New Testament and most of the Old Testament into a Romanized Taizhou dialect. He supervised the printing and oversaw distribution for several thousand documents in the local dialect. Reverend Rudland brought new technology to the press room which improved quality and quantity. He served as printing supervisor for the other mission districts as well. The British & Foreign Bible Society appointed him Honorary Governor for Life in 1911. Reverend William Rudland was the last surviving adult member of the Lammermuir Party before his death in 1912.

== Early years ==
Born in Harston, Cambridge, England, the only son of William and Abigail (nee Newman) Rudland, on 17 February 1839. His Father a Yeoman, a farmer who owned his own land, died in 1840. William's Mother struggled to support William and his older sister Elizabeth. In 1851 Abigail Rudland married James Stearn; a true blessing for William in many ways, now he would receive a solid education. In addition to the basics reading, writing, and math, family taught him blacksmithing and farming. His curiosity helped him learn to fix just about anything.

Sparked by his sister Elizabeth's departure for Australia, William knew he wanted more than spending his life on a farm. His Mother, a devout Christian, encouraged him to join Bible study groups. It was at one of these meetings that he met Annie MacPherson (a spiritual leader known for her devotion to helping poor and abandoned children) who became his mentor and lifelong friend. Annie gave him tickets to the Mildmay Conference in October 1864 where William first heard Hudson Taylor speak. The next year she introduced William to Hudson Taylor after the Mildmay Conference. William committed himself to the mission. He was quoted saying, "I know I can follow that man."

== Mission beginnings ==
By February 1866, Hudson Taylor decided William David Rudland, George Duncan, Lewis Nicol, Josiah Alexander Jackson, John Sell, and James Williamson, would sail with him as missionaries. Although the six had little or no formal education and none ordained, each brought skills and a love for Christ to the mission team. Taylor required each man to sign a memorandum stating God asked him to do His work in China, always look to God for their support, trust Him to provide it, and above all remain loyal to the mission. The Lammermuir sailed from the East India Docks, east of London, on 26 May 1866. On board the ship, William struggled with the motion of the waves and spent much time in his cabin. His roommate, James Williamson, spent many hours helping William study the Chinese language. William also became close friends with Josiah Jackson. Near the end of the voyage the ship crossed the path of two typhoons. Rudland, Williamson, and Jackson used their skills to repair the ship well enough to sail into port. The group landed in Shanghai on 30 September 1866.

Leaving Shanghai, the mission group sailed in small groups on separate boats. Under the cover of darkness they made their way to the mission house in Hangzhou. During his time in Hangzhou William struggled to learn Chinese. He often suffered from headaches brought on by hours of studying. One afternoon, deciding to take a break, he noticed native helpers trying unsuccessfully to put together a printing press. Enthusiastically he joined in. Using his tinkering skills they successfully put the printing press together. Hudson Taylor took notice and asked William to be in charge of the printing press. Just the boost William needed; full immersion into the language. Soon he became fluent, enough so to leave the mission house on various assignments.

During the voyage William took notice of the Taylor's governess, Mary Bell. William later told his children, "It was love at first sight." Engaged in June 1867, the two married on 25 December 1867.

Mary Bell 1866

After his marriage to Mary, they moved to Zhenjiang where he set up the mission press. A few weeks later, Taylor asked him to visit the new mission house in Yangzhou. Yangzhou Riot. On the night they arrived, riots broke out. Taylor went to the Prefect to discuss the problem. While he was gone, rioters broke through the stone walls, looting and burning everything they could get their hands on. William, Mary, Maria Taylor, and Emily Blatchley became trapped on the third floor. William very carefully lowered eight-month pregnant Mary down from the balcony to the waiting arms of Henry Reid. Mary, her sister Annie, and the Taylor children made their way to the well room to hide. William did his best to hold off the rioters so the others could escape. A rioter struck him in the head and cut his arm. He lowered himself down from the third floor then rushed to the well room to help the others find a safe home until the soldiers arrived to break up the riots. Almost a year later the Chinese government awarded him a permanent disability.

William and Mary returned to Zhenjiang where he continued to supervise the mission press. Marys' widowed older sister Annie (nee Bell) Bohannon became engaged to Edward Fishe on 18 September 1868. On 29 September 1868 Mary gave birth to a son, Ebenezer William. She gave birth to a daughter, Mary Annie, on 2 November 1869. Sadly, after a trip to visit Williams' sister and family in Australia, both children came down with whooping cough. Mary Annie died on 7 June 1870. She was buried next to Grace Taylor in Hangzhou. Due to public pressure, both girls were reburied in the British Cemetery in Zhenjiang. In 2013 construction crews unearthed the graves of Hudson and Maria Taylor. Despite cemetery records marking burial of the two girls next to Maria, their graves were not located.

== Mission work in Taizhou ==
Hearing of an opening in Taizhou, William felt the time was right to supervise a mission station. He asked Taylor for the transfer, Taylor agreed. William, Mary, and E. William moved southeast to Taizhou, Zhejiang Province. He left the press for someone else to manage.

Now station supervisor at Taizhou, William set out to talk to and help as many of the locals as possible. He traveled northeast across the mountains setting up a sub-station in K’yio (traditional name), west along the river from Taizhou Bay setting up sub-stations in Sienku and Tiantai, and southeast setting up sub-stations at Hangyan, Luqiao, and Wenling. Mary held bible studies and teas for the women. Edward and Annie Fishe started a school. William had many responsibilities which sometimes meant making about native helpers and other staff. William's brother-in-law Edward was upset when Taylor appointed William station supervisor, over time the tension grew. At one point William offered his letter of resignation; Taylor declined to accept it.

   Reverend Rudland's congregation in Taizhou gave him the
   Chinese name LU, Hui Li. Phonetically LU was his surname;
     Hui Li was his first name.
   LU means road; Hui means favor; Li means logic/reason.[3]

Mary gave birth to Mary Annie on 17 April 1871 and Grace Bell on 15 August 1872. Sadly on a visit to Paichon, Mary Annie died on 16 September 1872. Mary gave birth to Charles Asher on 30 September 1873. Soon after Charlie's birth Small Pox swept through the household. William became gravely ill. Mary nursed them through. Concerned that William might not make it, Taylor insisted that the family return to England. They set sail on a French Mail ship bound for Marseilles, France, along with Hudson and Jennie Taylor, and four children from the McCarthy family. The voyage took six weeks. Near the end of the voyage Mary became ill. She died on 23 October 1874, in London from typhoid fever.

William still very ill, needed time to recover from the loss of Mary. He and the children stayed with his mother in Bristol. During his furlough he completed course work to become an ordained minister, wrote articles for China's Millions, and lectured on the progress of mission work in China. Friends introduced him to Elizabeth Ellen Brealey, the daughter of George Brealey founder of the Blackdown Hills Mission in Somerset, England. William and Elizabeth married on 22 November 1875.

William returned to China with Elizabeth; without his three children. On board, Elizabeth gave birth to Wallace George on 26 October 1876. Taylor asked William to become a part of his management team, but William declined. He wanted to continue his work in Taizhou. Elizabeth had difficulty adjusting. Soon after arriving in Taizhou she became ill. Taylor ordered her return to England. After a ruckus in town, William took her to the home of his friends Josiah and Franny (nee Wilson) Jackson in Wenzhou where she died on 22 June 1878.

Alone again, William returned to Taizhou to continue his work. Taylor tried to talk him into going to another station further west to start over. Once again William declined. His friend James Williamson and family traveled down to help him for as long as he needed support. His friend Josiah Jackson lost his wife Franny in July 1878 soon after the birth of their daughter Emily. Jackson traveled north to help William whenever he could. Taking matters into her hands, Jennie Taylor (Mrs. Hudson Taylor) introduced William to her friend and fellow missionary Annie Knight. William and Annie married on 16 December 1879. Annie gave birth to Adeline Rose on 26 September 1880 in Shanghai.

Together William and Annie were a strong team. They dusted off the printing press from storage and set it up to run in Taizhou. Annie, a respected theological scholar, helped William run the station and supervise printing for the mission. In his off time, William taught himself Latin and Greek.

In 1885 William, Annie, and Rose returned to England. His oldest son, E. William, decided at 17 that he no longer wished to pursue an education or join his Father. William's friend Annie MacPherson arranged for E. William to migrate to Canada on "the Orphan Train" in March 1886. A year later Charles decided to make the same trip. William, upset, wanted his sons to have a full formal education then join him in China. William, along with Annie and Rose, returned to China in 1887 to continue his work.

By the close of 1894, the number of books translated and printed in the Taizhou Romanized dialect surpassed all goals. The Ningbo dialect primer William rewrote was now in its second edition. Booklets introducing the New Testament with questions and Bible helps flew off the shelves. They printed hymnals with over one hundred hymns. And, in 1893 William completed translating and printing the book of Psalms.

William's daughter Grace returned to China in 1893 to help her father. She became a missionary with the China Inland Mission in 1895. With Annie's health failing William decided to return to England on furlough, leaving Grace in China. They arrived on 15 May 1898.

Annie received medical treatment in England. Now healthy, refreshed, and ready to return to their beloved Taizhou, word came of the Boxer Rebellion. Unable to return, William gave lectures, wrote articles, and craved information about the rebellion. Just to the north of Taizhou several missionaries were brutally massacred. His daughter Grace and her friend Mary Williamson (James Williamsons' daughter) were among the last group to leave Shanghai. After recovering from her injuries, Grace remained in England helping the home office, refusing her father's offers to return to China. Grace married fellow missionary and Baptist minister Dennis Mills in 1919; Mary Williamson stood alongside her friend.

Receiving the all clear, William, Annie, and Rose departed for China on 18 November 1891. In his absence, C.I.M. decided the Taizhou district was too large for one person to supervise. They broke the district into four, each with its own supervisor. William was upset with the changes, but readily adapted. He set about visiting each station and working on the Old Testament translation.

William Rudland & daughter Grace 1910

Major life changes swept through William's life. Annie Rudland, his companion for twenty-five years, died on 22 September 1904. His mentor and friend Annie MacPherson died on 27 November 1904 in London. Hudson Taylor died on 3 June 1905 in Changsha, Hunan, China. William walked with hundreds of others at his funeral in Zhenjiang, where he was laid to rest next to Maria. ---- A few years later word came that his mother died on 2 April 1907. His daughter Rose, ill for some time, died 15 January 1909 from malignant malaria. Soon after, his close friend Josiah Jackson died on 19 April 1909 in Shanghai.

Surrounded by his native helpers and local congregation, William decided it was time to reduce his workload. He handed over the responsibility of daily church operations and decided to focus solely on completing the remaining books of the Old Testament. Next, he decided it was time to see his family. He sailed back to England where he took part in the Missionary World Conference, June 1910. On 23 July 1910 he boarded the S.S. Virginian from Liverpool to Quebec. He spoke to large crowds in Toronto about the History of the Printing Press in China in August 1910 . His next stop was a visit with his sons, E. William and Charles. For the first time he met their wives and his seven grandchildren.

Honor Stone

William returned to China aboard the S.S. Syria on 17 December 1910. After a brief illness he died on 10 January 1912. Reports from C.I.M. state that he died from a malignant tumor (cancer). William had suffered head injuries since he first arrived in China. Malignant had a different meaning than we know it today. It meant chronic or continuous.

Reverend William Rudland served the Lord and the Chinese people for forty-two years in the Taizhou district. The C.I.M. chapel filled to capacity with church members, preachers from long distances, city gentry, merchants, and scholars for his funeral. He was buried next to Annie and Rose on a gentle slope of the Taizhou valley.

Reverend Rudland's congregation honored him by erecting an "Honor Stone." Hidden by generations of followers the stone reappeared in 2011. The stone is on display in the Linhai Museum, Taizhou, China.
