= Renate Bertlmann =

Feminist avant-garde artist

- Born: 1943; Vienna, Austria
- Spouse: Reinhold Bertlmann (m. 1969)
- Website: bertlmann.com

Renate Bertlmann (born 1943, Vienna, Austria) is an Austrian feminist avant-garde visual artist, who since the early 1970s has worked on issues surrounding themes of sexuality, love, gender and eroticism within a social context, with her own body often serving as the artistic medium. Her diverse practice spans across painting, drawing, collage, photography, sculpture and performance, and actively confronts the social stereotypes assigned to masculine and feminine behaviours and relationships.

Bertlmann represented Austria at the 58th Venice Biennale in 2019. That year her exhibition 'Hier ruht meine Zärtlichkeit [Here lies my Tenderness]' inaugurated the new State Gallery of Lower Austria in Krems.

Renate Bertlmann is represented by Richard Saltoun Gallery, London and Galerie Steinek, Vienna.

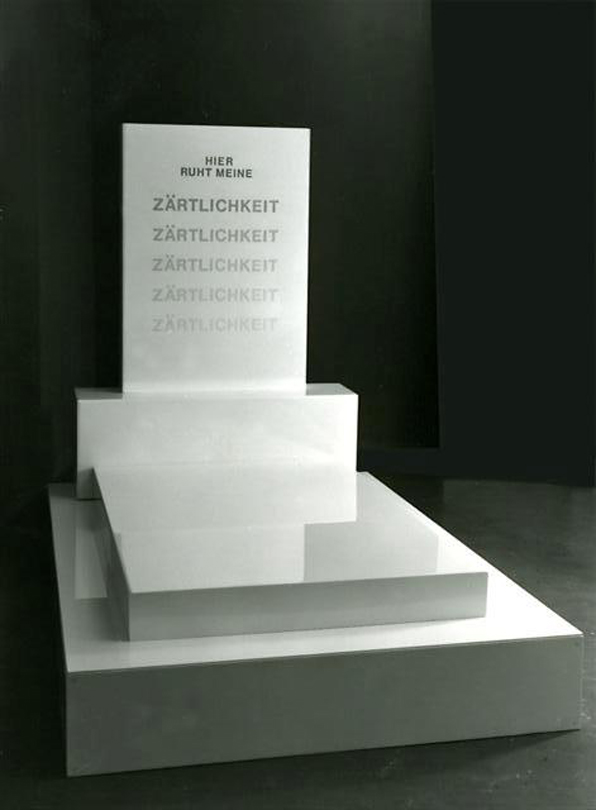
Hier ruht meine Zärtlichkeit, 1976

== Life ==
Renate Bertlmann was born in Vienna on the 28 February 1943. Renate's mother encouraged her daughter's artistic talent from an early age and she received her first camera at the age of fourteen from her uncle, Josef Mattiazzo. Between 1963 and 1964 she was in Oxford where she studied English and prepared for her entrance examination for the Academy of Fine Arts in Vienna, which she passed at the first attempt.

In 1964 Bertlmann began her studies at the Academy, where she took painting classes and learned traditional craft techniques. As a student, Bertlmann came in contact with the bias against women within the art world and started to foster her feminist consciousness by reading Luce Irigaray's This Sex Which is Not One (1977), Virginia Woolf's A Room of One's Own, and Simone de Beauvoir's The Second Sex (1949), among other seminal texts. In 1965, Bertlmann met Reinhold Bertlmann, a physics student, whom she married four years later. In 1969, Bertlmann created Verwandlungen [Transformations] (1969), posing for the camera with a self-timer, while wearing a series of outfits belonging to her mother.

In 1970, Professor Helmut Kortan offered Bertlmann a teaching position at the Academy, which she held for twelve years. There, she taught composition techniques, life drawing and various painting techniques. Aside from her work at the Academy, Bertlmann was also politically active. She worked for the journal published by 'AUF – Aktion Unabhängiger Frauen' [Action of Independent Women] and contributed texts and images. In 1973 she had her first exhibition at the Vienna Künstlerhaus. In 'Why Don't You Paint any Flowers?', the text written on the occasion of the exhibition, she invited women artists to bring the feminine into the world.

At this time, she made drawings based on literary interpretations. For example, Thomas Bernhard's play 'A Party for Boris' inspired her first wheelchair drawings. In addition, she started to create sculptures made of condoms with spikes, prongs and breaks to denounce male fantasies of violence against women. Similar works, such as Messerbrüste [Knifebreasts] (1975), focused on the oppression of women. In 1975, Bertlmann participated at ground-breaking exhibition 'MAGNA. Feminismus: Kunst und Kreativität' [MAGNA. Feminism: Art and Creativity] curated by Valie Export.

In 1976 she found the 'BC -Collective' with the colleague Linda Christanell, experimenting with Super-8 film. Some of her early performances include Deflorazione in 14 Stazioni [Defloration in 14 Stations], (1977) at the Museo Comunale d'Arte Moderna in Bologna, Die Schwangere Braut im Rollstuhl (Pregnant bride in wheelchair) (1978) at the Modern Art Gallery in Vienna, Die Schwangere Braut mit dem Klingelbeutel (The Pregnant Bride with the Collection Bag) (1978), and Let's Dance Together(1978) at Stichting de Appel, Amsterdam and the Modern Art Gallery, Vienna. Issues of self-actualisation, motherhood, sexuality and communication are the central focus of her performances. Simultaneously, Bertlmann produced staged photographs, such as Zärtliche Pantomime [Tender Pantomime], Zärtliche Berührungen [Tender Touches] (1976), and the series titled Reneé ou René (1977).

In 1978 Bertlmann started to use her motto 'AMO ERGO SUM' [I love, therefore I am], which inspires the production of an eponymous titled letter-box filled with 77 letters containing secret messages from the artist to other people. In addition, she starts to organise her work into the three related themes of 'Pornography', 'Irony' and 'Utopia'.

Since 1982, Bertlmann has worked as an independent artist. The same year, she displayed a series of latex objects titled Streicheleinheit [Caress] as the large-scale installation Waschtag [Washing Day] at the Women's Museum in Bonn, and participates in the action 'Dokumente', a parallel event during documenta 7 in Kassel.

In 1983, Bertlmann began addressing the theme of kitsch in her artistic production. Pictures of saints and reliquaries inspired the production of her work, while simultaneously working on the installation Rosemary Baby, which focuses on the mother-child relationship. In 1989, Bertlmann's three-volume book titled 'AMO ERGO SUM' is published on the occasion of her exhibition at the Secession in Vienna. Between 1988 and 1989, Bertlmann worked on a series of drawings, paintings and objects focusing on the themes of snow globes, magical devices and cheese covers.

In 1994 she became a member of the Secession in Vienna, and one year later curates the exhibition 'fem.art* - photographic obsessions' for the organisation FLUSS - Society for the Promotion of Photo and Media Art, Lower Austria, which she co-founded in 1989.

In 2000, during a six-months London residency founded by Austrian Ministry for Education, Art and Culture, Bertlmann creates Enfant terribles [e.g. Mama's Liebling, Innocenz VI.] (2001). In 2009, she realises a space-filling photographic film installation at the show Videorama in Kunsthalle Vienna. In 2014, Bertlmann participates at the 10th Gwangju Biennale, presenting Washing Day. Two years later, the SAMMLUNG VERBUND in Vienna presents a retrospective of Bertlmann's work, including full-size replicas of her installations, photographs, drawings and sculptures.

In 2019, she represented Austria at the 58th Venice Biennale with an endearing exhibition concept entitled 'Discordo Ergo Sum' ('I dissent, therefore I am'), consisting of three parts: the sculpture 'amo ergo sum', images of Renate Bertlmann's artistic practice and 312 knife roses in the backyard. At the same time she has a solo show 'Hier ruht meine Zärtlichkeit' in the new State Gallery of Lower Austria in Krems, in which a mixture of older and recent works emphasize the issue of tenderness in Bertlmann's feminist approach.

== Major exhibitions ==
- 1975 Magna feminismus, Galerie St. Stephan, Wìen
- 1977 Künstlerinnen International, Schloss Charlottenburg, Berlin
- 1978 Festival einer anderen Avantgarde, Brucknerhaus, Linz
- 1982 Stimmen der Sehnsucht, Galerie Apropos, Luzern
- 1985 Kunst mit Eigen-Sinn, Museum Moderner Kunst, Wien
- 1986 Bestehend-lebend-gegenwärtig, Museum Villa Stuck, München
- 1991 Außerhalb von Mittendrin, NGBK, Berlin
- 1993 Schneegestöber - Flitter(s)türme, Kunsthalle Exnergasse, Wien
- 2002 Werkschau VII, Arbeiten von 1976 – 2002, Fotogalerie Wien
- 2003 Künstlerinnen – Positionen 1945 bis heute, Kunsthalle Krems
- 2007 Top U29, Studio Tommaseo, Trieste
- 2008 MATRIX, Geschlechter/ Verhältnisse/Revisionen, MUSA
- 2009 VIDEORAMA — Kunstclips aus Österreich, Kunsthalle Wien
- 2009 rebelle. art and feminism 1969 - 2009, Museum voor Moderne Kunst Arnhem, the Netherlands
- 2010 DONNA: AVANGUARDIA FEMMINISTA NEGLI ANNI '70 dalla Sammlung Verbund di Vienna, Galleria Nazionale d'Arte Moderna, Roma
- 2013 MUJER/WOMAN, La vanguardia feminista de los anos 70, Circulo de Bellas Artes, Madrid
- 2013 TRANSFORMATIONS, Richard Saltoun Gallery, London
- 2014 AKTIONISTINNEN, Kunsthalle Krems/Frohner Forum, Krems
- 2014 Gwangju Biennale 2014 Burning Down The House, Gwangju, Südkorea
- 2014 IM DIALOG: WIENER AKTIONISMUS, Museum der Moderne Salzburg
- 2014 SELF-TIMER STORIES, Austrian Cultural Forum New York
- 2104 WOMAN, The Feminist Avant-Garde of the 1970s, BOZAR, Brüssel
- 2015 Feministische Avantgarde der 1970er Jahre, Sammlung Verbund, Hamburger Kunsthalle
- 2015 The World Goes POP, Tate Gallery of Modern Art
- 2015 SELF-TIMER STORIES, Musac, Leon, Spain
- 2015 Die achziger Jahre in der Sammlung des MUSA, MUSA Museum, Wien
- 2015 RABENMÜTTER zwischen Kraft und Krise: Mütterbilder von 1900 bis heute, Lentos Kunstmuseum, Linz
- 2016 Prière de Toucher – The Touch of Art, Museum Tinguely, Basel, Switzerland
- 2017 Renate Bertlmann and Maria Lassnig, Sotheby's S|2 Gallery, London, UK
- 2017 Live End Dream No, Galerie Steinek, Vienna, Austria
- 2018 Women Look at Women, Richard Saltoun Gallery, London, UK
- 2018 AKTION: Conceptual Art and Photography (1960-1980), Richard Saltoun Gallery, London, UK
- 2018 DRAG: Self-portraits and Body Politics, Hayward Gallery, London, UK
- 2019 The House of the Sleeping Beauties, Sotheby's S|2 Gallery, London, UK
- 2019 Zorn und Zärtlichkeit/Rage and Tenderness, State Gallery of Lower Austria, Krems, Austria
- 2019 Austrian Pavilion, Biennale Arte 2019, 58th International Art Exhibition, Venice, Italy

== Awards ==
- 1978: Theodor Körner award
- 1980: Z-Promotional award
- 1989: Promotional award of the city of Vienna
- 2007: Great award of the city of Vienna
- 2017: Grand Austrian State Prize

== Bibliography ==
- Renate Berger: Und ich sehe nichts, nichts als die Malerei. Autobiographische Texte von Künstlerinnen des 18.-20. Jahrhunderts, 1989, Fischer Taschenbuch, ISBN 978-3596237227
- Renate Bertlmann: Amo ergo sum. Eine Trilogie. 3 Teile. Ritter Verlag, Klagenfurt 1989, ISBN 3-85415-074-1.
- Renate Bertlmann: Amo ergo sum. Works 1972 bis 2010. deA-Verlag, Gumpoldskirchen 2011, ISBN 978-3-901867-35-4.
- Herbert Klophaus: Bestehend – lebend – gegenwärtig. Museum Villa Stuck, München, 19. Juni – 27. Juli 1986. Continuum e.V., München 1986 (Ausstellungskatalog).
- Peter Gorsen: Sexualästhetik. Grenzformen der Sinnlichkeit im 20. Jahrhundert (= Rowohlts Enzyklopädie 447). Rowohlt-Taschenbuch-Verlag, Reinbek bei Hamburg 1987, ISBN 3-499-55447-X.
- Susanne Gamauf (Red.): Werkschau VII – Renate Bertlmann, Arbeiten von 1976 – 2002 (= Fotobuch. Nr. 28.) Texte von Renate Bertlmann, Edith Almhofer. Fotogalerie Wien u. a., Wien 2002, ISBN 3-902725-13-3.
- Mirjam Westen (Hrsg.): Rebelle. Art & Feminism 1969 – 2009. (Published after the Exhibition REBELLE. Kunst en Feminism 1969 – 2009, 30 May – 23 August 2009, organized by Museum voor Moderne Kunst Arnhem). Museum voor Moderne Kunst, Arnhem 2010, ISBN 978-90-72861-45-0.
- Gabriele Schor (Hrsg.): Donna: avanguardia femminista negli anni '70. Dalla Sammlung Verbund di Vienna. (Roma, Galleria nazionale d'arte moderna, 19 febbraio – 16 maggio 2010). Electa, Mailand 2010, ISBN 978-88-370-7414-2.
- Renate Bertlmann: WORKS 1972 -2010, DVD Rom, D.E.A. Almhofer & Cie KG, Gumpoldskirchen – Wien, ISBN 978-3-90186735-4
- VERBUND, Katalog zur Ausstellung, Bozar Books, 2014, ISBN 978 9074816434
- Hier steht ein Sessel, Galerie im Traklhaus, Katalog zur Ausstellung, Verlag Jung-Jung 2014, ISBN 978-3-99027063-9
- BURNING DOWN THE HOUSE, Katalog zur 10th Gwangju Biennale, South Korea, 2014, ISBN 978-88-6208-381-2
- SELF-TIMER STORIES, Austrian Cultural Forum, New York, 2014, ISBN 978-3-7025-0772-5
- Aktionistinnen, Frohner Fohrum Krems, 2014, ISBN 978-3-901261-60-2
- FEMINISTISCHE AVANTGARDE, Kunst der 1970er Jahre aus der Sammlung VERBUND, Hamburger Kunsthalle, 2015, ISBN 978-3-7913-5445-3
- Die siebziger Jahre in der Sammlung des MUSA, MUSA Museum, Wien, 2015, Verlag Ambra, ISBN 978-3-99043-560-1
- Die achziger Jahre in der Sammlung des MUSA, 2015, Verlag De Gruyter, ISBN 978-3-11-043892-5,
