= Reinhold Bertlmann =

Austrian theoretical physicist (born 1945)

Reinhold Anton Bertlmann
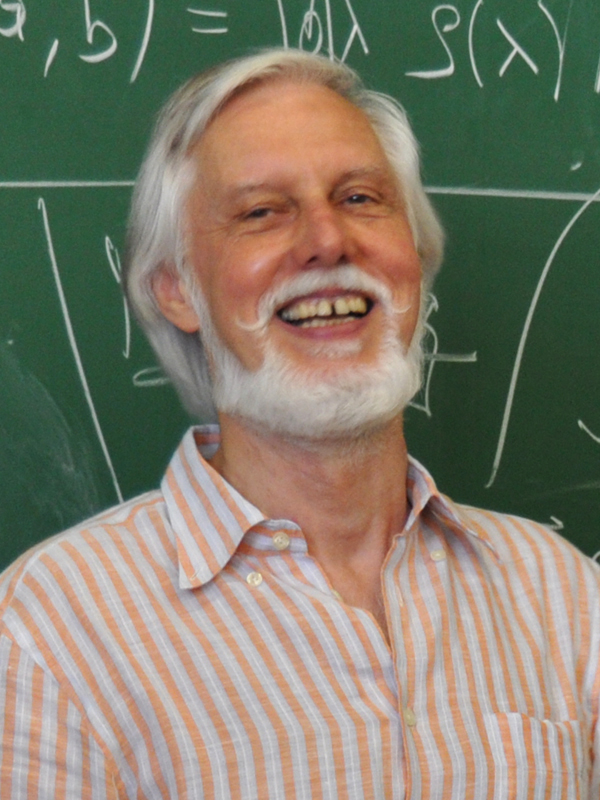
- Reinhold Bertlmann in 2010
- Born: March 7, 1945 (age 80); Reutte, Tyrol, Austria
- Education: Vienna University of Technology; University of Vienna
- Spouse: Renate Bertlmann
- Scientific career
- Institutions: JINR; CERN; University of Vienna
- Thesis: Über den Einfluß von Superkonvergenzrelationen auf vektordominierte Prozesse (1974)
- Doctoral advisor: Herbert Pietschmann
- Website: homepage.univie.ac.at/reinhold.bertlmann/about/

Reinhold Anton Bertlmann (born 7 March 1945 in Reutte) is an Austrian-born physicist and professor of physics at the University of Vienna. He is known for his research in particle physics, where he wrote the standard textbook Anomalies in Quantum Field Theory, and in the field of Bell inequalities, in particular from the quantum comparison Bertlmann’s Socks of John Bell.

== Education and career ==
Bertlmann studied technical physics at the Vienna University of Technology and Theoretical Physics at the University of Vienna, where he received his Ph.D. degree in 1974. He worked as a scientist in Vienna, at the JINR in Dubna and at CERN. After his Habilitation in Theoretical Physics in Vienna 1981 about Duality between resonances and asymptotia, he held visiting professorships in Marseille, at the University Paris-Sud and at the CNRS. From 1987 until his retirement in 2010 he was university professor at the University of Vienna, where he is still lecturing. Reinhold Bertlmann has been married to the artist Renate Bertlmann since 1969.

== Physics ==
Bertlmann works in quantum physics; in particular he is occupied with Bell inequalities, entanglement, decoherence and geometry of quantum systems. In addition he is concerned with anomalies in quantum field theory.

Bertlmann was a close friend and collaborator of the late John Stewart Bell and worked together with Walter Thirring. Presently, he collaborates with Anton Zeilinger, with whom he organized the celebrated quantum conferences Quantum [Un]Speakables I in 2000 and Quantum [Un]Speakables II in 2014. The resulting collections of the 2000 essays, under the same title Quantum [Un]Speakables, has become seminal for the field.

In 2000 he published the textbook Anomalies in Quantum Field Theory, which became a popular introductory text to quantum field theory and differential geometry. In 2023 he published the textbook Modern Quantum Theory, written together with his former student Nicolai Friis, covering quantum mechanics and quantum information theory.

== Bertlmann’s socks ==
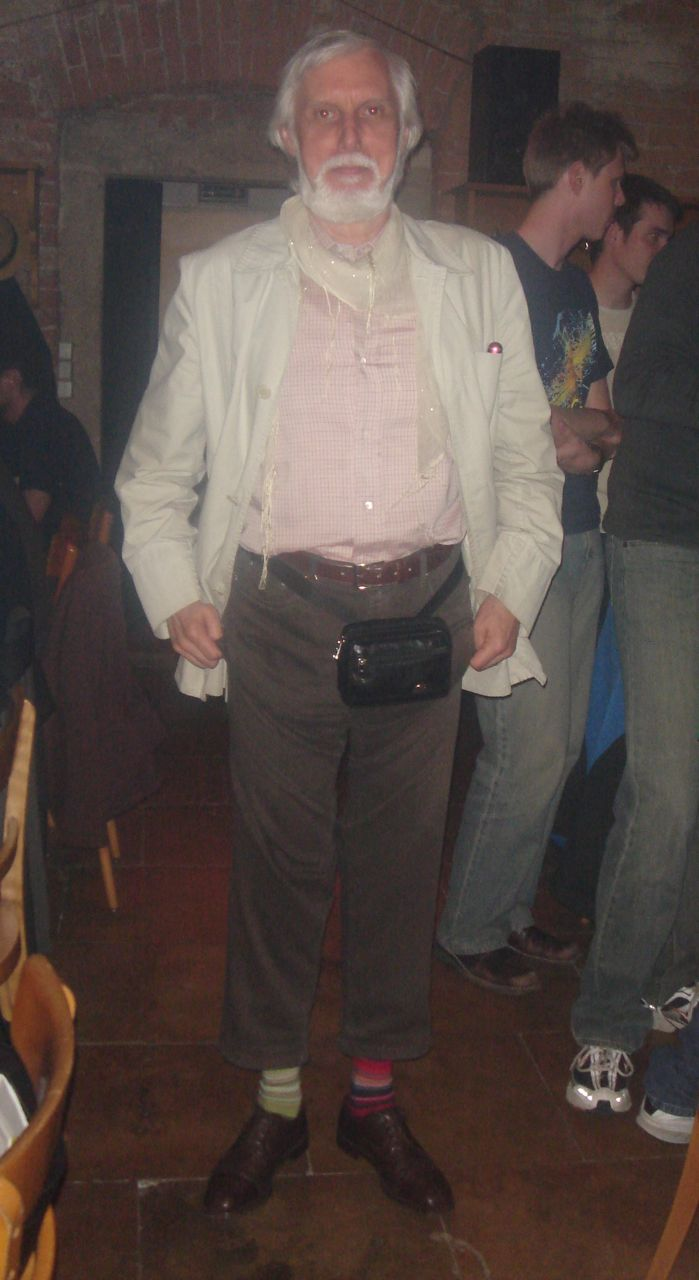
Reinhold Bertlmann showing his socks, Vienna, 30 Aug 2007

In 1978 Bertlmann went to CERN, where he worked together with J. S. Bell. Bertlmann always wore socks of different colours. In 1981 Bell wrote the article "Bertlmann’s socks and the nature of reality", where he compared the EPR paradox with Bertlmann’s socks: if you observe one sock to be pink you can predict with certainty that the other sock is not pink. Thus you might assume that quantum entanglement is just the same. However, this is a non-admissible simplification, and Bell in his article explains why.

Bell’s article is reprinted in his book Speakable and Unspeakable in Quantum Mechanics and is discussed in the books of Andrew Whitaker The New Quantum Age, Louisa Gilder's The Age of Entanglement and Nature loves to hide by Shimon Malin.

In 2015, Bertlmann wrote a lengthy piece "Bell's Universe: A Personal Recollection", explaining in some detail his amazement at finding out about Bell's paper on the socks.

== Literature ==
- J.S. Bell: "Bertlmann's socks and the nature of reality". J. Phys. Colloques. 42 (C2), March 1981. Also available online PDF-File
- J.S. Bell: Speakable and Unspeakable in Quantum Mechanics, Cambridge University Press, Cambridge, 1987 ISBN 0-521-52338-9
- R.A. Bertlmann: Magic Moments: A collaboration with John Bell, see Reinhold Bertlmann homepage
- R.A. Bertlmann: Anomalies in Quantum Field Theory, Clarendon Press, Oxford 2000 (paperback), ISBN 0-19-850762-3
- R.A. Bertlmann, A. Zeilinger: Quantum [Un]speakables. From Bell to Quantum Information, Springer-Verlag 2002, ISBN 3-540-42756-2
- R.A. Bertlmann: John Bell and the Nature of the Quantum World, Journal of Physics A: Math. Theor. 47, 424007 (2014)
- R.A. Bertlmann, N. Friis: Modern Quantum Theory. From Quantum Mechanics to Entanglement and Quantum Information, Oxford University Press, Oxford 2023, ISBN 9780199683338

== See also ==
- Anton Zeilinger
- John Stewart Bell
