= Mary Bell (American Civil War nurse) =

Mary Bell (born July 28, 1840) was an American nurse and hospital matron during the American Civil War.

== Civil War service ==
Bell was born in Hillsboro, Ohio. She left Ohio in September 1863 to join the Civil War effort. Her work began with her husband A.O. Hartley, who was a hospital steward, at Covington Barracks in Kentucky. While the two were in camp, there were outbreaks of diseases such as smallpox and spotted fever. In November, Bell was ordered to Munfordsville, Kentucky, where she was soon appointed matron of a hospital by its head surgeon. Part of her duties included taking special care of the patients' diets, often poor. Bell remained at this location until May 1864, when she went to a Jacksonville hospital as troops moved to the front.

== After the war ==
Ultimately, Bell's service in the Civil War lasted over three years. Her husband did not survive the war; he was killed while performing his duties in Chattanooga, Tennessee. After the war, Bell taught for a year at Fisk University in Nashville, Tennessee, as well as at other institutions for the following three years. Bell later relocated to Albion, Michigan.
