= Mary Ross Bell =

Physicist

- Born: 1923; Glasgow
- Died: 2022 (aged 98–99)
- Education: Hyndland Secondary School; University of Glasgow
- Spouse: John Stewart Bell
- Scientific career
- Workplaces: UKAEA Harwell (now Harwell Science and Innovation Campus); CERN

Mary Ross Bell (1923–2022) was a physicist who worked at Harwell Science and Innovation Campus and CERN. She worked on accelerator physics, electron cooling and storage rings.

== Early life and education ==
Ross Bell was born in Glasgow. Her father, Alexander, worked in a shipbuilding yard, and her mother, Catherine, was a primary school teacher. She attended Hyndland Secondary School, a co-educational school that taught physics. She applied for the prestigious High School of Glasgow, was awarded a scholarship, but stayed at Hyndland because of their exceptional science teaching. At the beginning of the Second World War Bell spent an academic year at Kingussie High School, 30 miles south of Inverness, where she wrote fiction. When she returned to Hyndland she won several prizes for academic excellence. She was awarded a scholarship at the University of Glasgow and this would pay all her fees. She studied mathematics and natural philosophy at Glasgow, with a focus on electronics and circuits. In 1944 Ross Bell was called to serve for her country and joined the Telecommunications Research Establishment. The Director General at the TRE offered her a permanent position, but Ross Bell decided to return to study at Glasgow.

== Career ==
After graduating from Glasgow, Ross Bell joined the theory division at the United Kingdom Atomic Energy Authority. At the time around 15% of the employees were women. She worked on calculating neutron absorption cross-sections in interactions with protons, deuterons, alpha particles and gamma-particles, and also in nuclear fission. She was approached by Klaus Fuchs, Head of the Theory Division, who asked her to examine the effect of control rods in fission reactors. In 1949 John Stewart Bell arrived at Harwell, where he was interviewed by Fuchs and eventually joined the Theory Division. In 1950 it emerged that Fuchs had been spying for Russia, and he went to prison for 14 years. Bell and Ross Bell ended up in the same group on accelerator physics. Here Ross Bell was part of the Theory Division, and worked on the theory of short (2 metre) electron accelerators with disc-loaded guides. Using approximations for electromagnetic fields, Ross Bell estimated losses in the guides and electron bunching after acceleration. Her research on electron and proton linear accelerators were published in Harwell reports, which were used by teams of scientists around the world.

== CERN ==
At the end of the 1950s, Ross Bell moved to CERN. This was partly due to an increasing in military and industrial work at Harwell, and a concern that her and her husband would not both get jobs in the same university.^{[2]} At CERN Mary joined the Accelerator Search Division, and later the Intersecting Storage Rings Division, and later still the Proton Synchrotron Division. she worked on electron linear accelerators and radio frequency separators.

In 1963 Ross Bell spent a year at the SLAC National Accelerator Laboratory, Brandeis University and the University of Wisconsin–Madison.

=== Electron cooling, storage rings and accelerator physics ===
Towards the end of the 1960s she joined the electron cooling group. The detection of the W and Z particles required breakthroughs in engineering such that the antiproton beam had a density equivalent to the proton beam, reducing any thermal oscillations. In 1979 she described the electron cooling in a series of papers. ^{[38]} ^{[39,40]} ^{[41]} Eventually CERN settled on the stochastic cooling technique, but electron cooling was used in the Low Energy Antiproton Ring which decelerated and stored antiprotons.^{[42]} Ross Bell worked on magnetic cooling and storage rings. Her calculations were consistently more rigorous, reproducible and transferable to other accelerators. Towards the end of the 1980s Ross Bell expanded to accelerator physics. In particular, she worked on beamstrahlung, the accelerator analog of bremsstrahlung.

== Personal life ==
Ross Bell married John Stewart Bell in 1954. They had a small wedding in Wantage, with guests including William Walkinshaw and his wife, and two witnesses from the accelerator group. They moved into one of the bungalows on the Harwell site. Ross Bell remarked that their marriage was a relationship of "weekends", as Bell had been appointed to the physics department at the University of Birmingham, where he worked on the CPT Theorem. Ross Bell and her husband collaborated throughout their lives.
