= Mary and Annie Bell =

Mary Bell
- Born: 22 April 1844; Great Waltham, Essex, England
- Died: 23 October 1874 (aged 30); Islington, London, England
- Resting place: Abney Park Cemetery, Stoke Newington, London, England
- Other names: En Sing
- Spouse: William David Rudland
- Children: Ebenezer William, Mary Annie, Mary Annie, Grace Bell, Charles Asher

Annie (Ann) Bell
- Born: 22 April 1844; Great Waltham, Essex, England
- Died: 26 March 1926 (aged 81); Denmark, Western Australia
- Resting place: Denmark, Western Australia
- Spouses: Nathaniel Bohannon; Edward Fishe
- Children: Jessie Marion, Charles Hugh, Lucy Mary, Arthur Henry

Mary Bell (22 April 1844 – 23 October 1874) and Annie (Ann) Bell (22 April 1844 – 26 March 1926) were pioneering Christian Missionaries and members of the China Inland Mission (CIM). They were born in Great Waltham, Essex, the twin daughters of William Bell (a local shoemaker) and his wife Sophia (née Collins). The family were raised as members of the Little Waltham Independent Congregational Church. Mary travelled to China as a member of the Lammermuir Party in 1866 and subsequently married William David Rudland, a fellow missionary and member of the CIM. Annie followed her sister to China a year and a half later, sailing on the Clipper Taitsing. She subsequently married Edward Fishe, also a fellow missionary with the CIM. Both Mary and Annie worked alongside their husbands in the various mission stations where they were based. They gave Bible classes to the local women and established and ran schools for local children. Their work was instrumental not only in spreading the gospels, but crucially, in establishing and building trust within the local communities.
