= Diamond norm =

Term in quantum information theory

In quantum information, the diamond norm, also known as completely bounded trace norm, is a norm on the space of quantum operations, or more generally on any linear map that acts on complex matrices. Its main application is to measure the "single use distinguishability" of two quantum channels. If an agent is randomly given one of two quantum channels, permitted to pass one state through the unknown channel, and then measures the state in an attempt to determine which operation they were given, then their maximal probability of success is determined by the diamond norm of the difference of the two channels.

Although the diamond norm can be efficiently computed via semidefinite programming, it is in general difficult to obtain analytical expressions and those are known only for a few particular cases.

== Definition ==
The diamond norm is the trace norm of the output of a trivial extension of a linear map, maximized over all possible inputs with trace norm at most one. More precisely, let $\Phi: M_n(\mathbb{C}) \to M_m(\mathbb{C})$ be a linear transformation, where $M_n(\mathbb{C})$ denotes the $n \times n$ complex matrices, let $\mathbb{1}_n: M_n(\mathbb{C}) \to M_n(\mathbb{C})$ be the identity map on $n \times n$ matrices, and $X \in M_{n^2}(\mathbb{C})$. Then the diamond norm of $\Phi$ is given by

$$\|\Phi\|_\diamond := \max_{X;\|X\|_1 \le 1}\|(\Phi \otimes \mathbb{1}_n)X\|_1,$$

where $\|\cdot\|_1$ denotes the trace norm.

The diamond norm induces the diamond distance, which in the particular case of completely positive, trace non-increasing maps $\mathcal E ,\mathcal F$ is given by

$$d_\diamond(\mathcal E,\mathcal F) := \|\mathcal E - \mathcal F\|_\diamond = \max_{\rho}\|(\mathcal{E} \otimes \mathbb{1}_n)\rho - (\mathcal{F} \otimes \mathbb{1}_n)\rho\|_1,$$

where the maximization is done over all density matrices $\rho$ of dimension $n^2$.

== Discrimination of quantum channels ==
In the task of single-shot discrimination of quantum channels, an agent is given one of the channels $\mathcal E ,\mathcal F$ with probabilities p and 1-p, respectively, and attempts to guess which channel he received by preparing a state $\rho$, passing it through the unknown channel, and making a measurement on the resulting state. The maximal probability that the agent guesses correctly is given by

$$p_\text{succ} = \frac12 + \frac12 \|p \mathcal E - (1-p)\mathcal F\|_\diamond$$.

Remarkably, employing an entangled input state $\rho$ can strictly enhance distinguishability, even between entanglement-breaking channels. This result underlies quantum illumination protocols.

== Semidefinite programming formulation ==
The diamond norm can be efficiently calculated via semidefinite programming. Let $\Phi : A \to B$ be a linear map, as before, and $J(\Phi) \in A \otimes B$ its Choi state, defined as

$$J(\Phi) := \sum_{ij} |i\rangle\langle j| \otimes \Phi(|i\rangle\langle j|)$$.

The diamond norm of $\Phi$ is then given by the solution of the following semidefinite programming problem:

$$\begin{align}
\max_{Y,\sigma} \quad& \operatorname{tr}(Y J(\Phi)) \\
\text{subject to} \quad &-\sigma \otimes I \preceq Y \preceq\sigma \otimes I  \\
& \quad\quad\quad \operatorname{tr}(\sigma) = 1
\end{align}$$

where $Y \in A \otimes B$ and $\sigma \in A$ are Hermitian matrices.
