= Channel-state duality =

In quantum information theory, the channel-state duality refers to the correspondence between quantum channels and quantum states (described by density matrices). Phrased differently, the duality is the isomorphism between completely positive maps (channels) from A to C^{n×n}, where A is a C*-algebra and C^{n×n} denotes the n×n complex entries, and positive linear functionals (states) on the tensor product

$$\mathbb{C}^{n \times n} \otimes A.$$

== Details ==
Let H_{1} and H_{2} be (finite-dimensional) Hilbert spaces. The family of linear operators acting on H_{i} will be denoted by L(H_{i}). Consider two quantum systems, indexed by 1 and 2, whose states are density matrices in L(H_{i}) respectively. A quantum channel, in the Schrödinger picture, is a completely positive (CP for short), trace-preserving linear map

$$\Phi : L(H_1) \rightarrow L(H_2)$$

that takes a state of system 1 to a state of system 2. Next, we describe the dual state corresponding to Φ.

Let E_{i j} denote the matrix unit whose ij-th entry is 1 and zero elsewhere. The (operator) matrix

$$\rho_{\Phi} = (\Phi(E_{ij}))_{ij} \in L(H_1) \otimes L(H_2)$$

is called the Choi matrix of Φ. By Choi's theorem on completely positive maps, Φ is CP if and only if ρ_{Φ} is positive (semidefinite). One can view ρ_{Φ} as a density matrix, and therefore the state dual to Φ.

The duality between channels and states refers to the map

$$\Phi \rightarrow \rho_{\Phi},$$

a linear bijection. This map is also called Jamiołkowski isomorphism or Choi–Jamiołkowski isomorphism.

== Applications ==
This isomorphism is used to show that the "Prepare and Measure" Quantum Key Distribution (QKD) protocols, such as the BB84 protocol devised by C. H. Bennett and G. Brassard are equivalent to the "Entanglement-Based" QKD protocols, introduced by A. K. Ekert. More details on this can be found e.g. in the book Quantum Information Theory by M. Wilde.
