= Quantum instrument =

Mathematical abstraction of quantum measurement

In quantum physics, a quantum instrument is a mathematical description of a quantum measurement, capturing both the classical and quantum outputs. It can be equivalently understood as a quantum channel that takes as input a quantum system and has as its output two systems: a classical system containing the outcome of the measurement and a quantum system containing the post-measurement state.

== Definition ==
Let $X$ be a countable set describing the outcomes of a quantum measurement, and let $\{\mathcal{E}_x \}_{x\in X}$ denote a collection of trace-non-increasing completely positive maps, such that the sum of all $\mathcal{E}_x$ is trace-preserving, i.e. $\operatorname{tr}\left(\sum_x\mathcal{E}_x(\rho)\right)=\operatorname{tr}(\rho)$ for all positive operators $\rho.$

Now for describing a measurement by an instrument $\mathcal{I}$, the maps $\mathcal{E}_x$ are used to model the mapping from an input state $\rho$ to the output state of a measurement conditioned on a classical measurement outcome $x$. Therefore, the probability that a specific measurement outcome $x$ occurs on a state $\rho$ is given by $p(x|\rho)=\operatorname{tr}(\mathcal{E}_x(\rho)).$

The state after a measurement with the specific outcome $x$ is given by

$\rho_x=\frac{\mathcal{E}_x(\rho)}{\operatorname{tr}(\mathcal{E}_x(\rho))}.$

If the measurement outcomes are recorded in a classical register, whose states are modeled by a set of orthonormal projections $|x\rangle\langle x| \in \mathcal{B}(\mathbb{C}^{|X|})$ , then the action of an instrument $\mathcal{I}$ is given by a quantum channel $\mathcal{I}:\mathcal{B}(\mathcal{H}_1) \rightarrow \mathcal{B}(\mathcal{H}_2)\otimes \mathcal{B}(\mathbb{C}^{|X|})$ with

$\mathcal{I}(\rho):= \sum_x \mathcal{E}_x ( \rho)\otimes \vert x \rangle \langle x|.$

Here $\mathcal{H}_1$ and $\mathcal{H}_2 \otimes \mathbb{C}^{|X|}$ are the Hilbert spaces corresponding to the input and the output systems of the instrument.

== Reductions and inductions ==
Just as a completely positive trace preserving (CPTP) map can always be considered as the reduction of unitary evolution on a system with an initially unentangled auxiliary, quantum instruments are the reductions of projective measurement with a conditional unitary, and also reduce to CPTP maps and POVMs when ignore measurement outcomes and state evolution, respectively. In John Smolin's terminology, this is an example of "going to the Church of the Larger Hilbert space".

=== As a reduction of projective measurement and conditional unitary ===
Any quantum instrument on a system $\mathcal{S}$ can be modeled as a projective measurement on $\mathcal{S}$ and (jointly) an uncorrelated auxiliary $\mathcal{A}$ followed by a unitary conditional on the measurement outcome. Let $\eta$ (with $\eta > 0$ and $\mathrm{Tr} \, \eta =1$) be the normalized initial state of $\mathcal{A}$, let $\{\Pi_i\}$ (with $\Pi_i = \Pi_i^\dagger = \Pi_i^2$ and $\Pi_i \Pi_j = \delta_{ij} \Pi_i$) be a projective measurement on $\mathcal{SA}$, and let $\{U_i\}$ (with $U_i^\dagger = U_i^{-1}$) be unitaries on $\mathcal{SA}$. Then one can check that

$$\mathcal{E}_i (\rho) := \mathrm{Tr}_{\mathcal{A}}\left(U_i\Pi_i(\rho\otimes\eta)\Pi_i U_i^\dagger\right)$$

defines a quantum instrument. Furthermore, one can also check that any choice of quantum instrument $\{\mathcal{E}_i\}$ can be obtained with this construction for some choice of $\eta$ and $\{U_i\}$.

In this sense, a quantum instrument can be thought of as the reduction of a projective measurement combined with a conditional unitary.

=== Reduction to CPTP map ===
Any quantum instrument $\{\mathcal{E}_i\}$ immediately induces a CPTP map, i.e., a quantum channel:

$$\mathcal{E} (\rho) := \sum_i \mathcal{E}_i(\rho).$$

This can be thought of as the overall effect of the measurement on the quantum system if the measurement outcome is thrown away.

=== Reduction to POVM ===
Any quantum instrument $\{\mathcal{E}_i\}$ immediately induces a positive operator-valued measurement (POVM):

$$M_i := \sum_a K_a^{(i)\dagger} K_a^{(i)}$$

where $K_a^{(i)}$ are any choice of Kraus operators for $\mathcal{E}_i$,

$$\mathcal{E}_i (\rho) = \sum_a  K_a^{(i)}\rho K_a^{(i)\dagger}.$$

The Kraus operators $K_a^{(i)}$ are not uniquely determined by the CP maps $\mathcal{E}_i$, but the above definition of the POVM elements $M_i$ is the same for any choice. The POVM can be thought of as the measurement of the quantum system if the information about how the system is affected by the measurement is thrown away.
