= S. L. Woronowicz =

Polish mathematician and physicist

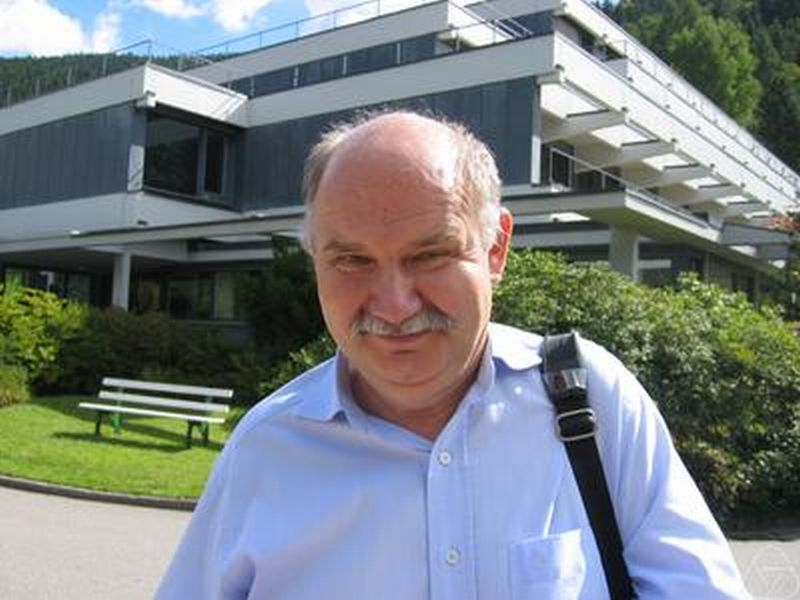
- Woronowicz in 2004
- Born: 22 July 1941 (age 85); Ukmergė, Lithuania
- Education: University of Warsaw
- Known for: quantum groups, quantum information theory, completely positive map
- Awards: Sierpiński Medal (2010); Stefan Banach Medal (2009); Humboldt Research Award (2008); Prize of the Foundation for Polish Science (1993)
- Scientific career
- Fields: Mathematics theoretical physics
- Workplaces: University of Warsaw; Polish Academy of Sciences

Stanisław Lech Woronowicz (born 22 July 1941) is a Polish mathematician and theoretical physicist. He is affiliated with the University of Warsaw and is a member of the Polish Academy of Sciences. Between 1981–1984, he served as dean at the Faculty of Physics of the University of Warsaw. Since 1993, he has been a member of the Scientific Council of the Theoretical Physics Center at the Polish Academy of Sciences.

== Research ==
Woronowicz and Erling Størmer classified positive maps in low-dimensional cases, which translate to the Peres–Horodecki criterion in the context of quantum information theory. He is also known for contributions to quantum groups.

== Awards ==
Woronowicz was an invited speaker at International Congress of Mathematicians in Warsaw in 1983 and in Kyoto in 1990.

In 1993, he received the Prize of the Foundation for Polish Science for his work on quantum groups and their relations with C*-algebra. He was also awarded Humboldt Research Award in 2008, and Stefan Banach Medal of the Polish Academy of Sciences in 2009.
