= Gershon Kurizki =

Israeli theoretical quantum physicist

- גרשון קוריצקי
- Born: October 29, 1952 (age 74); Vilnius, Soviet Union
- Education: Technion (B.Sc., 1974); Technion (M.Sc., 1979); University of New Mexico (PhD, 1983)
- Occupation: Physicist
- Employer: Weizmann Institute of Science
- Known for: Works in quantum optics, thermodynamics and open systems
- Title: G. W. Dunne Chair in Quantum Optics (1996-2024)

Gershon Kurizki (Hebrew: גרשון קוריצקי; born October 29, 1952) is a theoretical quantum physicist, known for his contributions to the fields of quantum light-matter interaction, control of quantum system interactions with the environment, quantum thermodynamics and quantum measurement theory. Since 1997 he has been a professor at the Weizmann Institute of Science, Israel, where he is still actively engaged in research as professor emeritus. He has so far coauthored more than 320 research articles, among those over 60 articles in high-profile journals (Nature, Science Advances, Proceedings of the National Academy of Sciences, Nature Communications, Physical Review Letters) and two books. His work has been cited to date more than 15,830 times on Google Scholar, giving him an h-index of 66 as of September 2026.

Gershon Kurizki has published poetry and philosophical essays in literary and philosophical magazines and books. His book "The Quantum Matrix" (Oxford University Press, 2020) renders scientific, philosophical and poetic descriptions of the world.

== Biography ==
Gershon Kurizki was born in 1952 in Vilnius, Lithuania (then the Soviet Union). He immigrated to Israel with his family in 1960. After completing his B.Sc. and M.Sc. in physics at the Technion in 1979, he moved in 1980 to the University of New Mexico, USA, where he obtained his Ph. D in physics in 1983. His doctoral thesis, written under the supervision of Marlan Scully and John McIver, was on radiation from fast-charged particles in crystals.

He was appointed lecturer at Tel Aviv University in 1983. He subsequently moved to the Weizmann Institute where he was appointed senior scientist in 1987, associate professor with tenure in 1991 and professor in 1997. From 1996 to 2024 he held the Dunne Professorial Chair in Quantum Optics at the Weizmann Institute. Throughout the years, he served as visiting professor at the Universities of Aarhus in Denmark, Ulm and Heidelberg in Germany, and Shanghai in China.

He coordinated 3 multi-national EU projects and participated in multiple US (NSF-sponsored) and European, particularly German (DFG-sponsored) projects. He delivered invited or plenary talks at ca. 350 conferences and workshops worldwide.

His editorial service has included a term as Topical Editor of the Journal of Physics B and of Optics Letters from 2000 to 2012 and, since 2023, a seat on the Advisory Board of Applied Physics Letters, Quantum.

Over a research career spanning more than four decades, his laboratory has trained 36 postdoctoral researchers and 21 PhD students, eleven of the latter receiving distinction awards from the Weizmann Institute; roughly two-thirds of his former trainees have gone on to academic positions of their own. His research today continues through an international network of collaborators spanning Austria, the Czech Republic, Greece, Germany, India, Italy, Lithuania, Spain, Turkey, and the United States.

Among his former trainees are academics such as Nir Bar-Gill, Miriam Blaauboer, Arnab Chakrabarti, Ze Cheng, Bimalendu Deb, Arnab Ghosh, David Gelbwaser-Klimovsky, Yonathan Japha, Igor Mazets, Avijit Misra, Victor Mukherjee, Goren Gordon, Duncan O'Dell, Tomáš Opatrný, David Petrosyan and Ephraim Shahmoon.

Gershon Kurizki is married to Zipora (Zipi, nee Zmishlany). He has two sons, Naham (b. 1978) and Yodan (b. 1986).

== Research ==
=== Quantum Zeno and Anti-Zeno control ===
Kurizki and coworkers developed a theory of decay and decoherence control that exploits two opposing universal effects. One is the quantum Zeno effect (QZE) of decay slowdown, whereas the other one is its inverse, the anti-Zeno effect (AZE) of decay speedup. They showed that both effects, originally thought to be caused by frequent measurements of the system, arise under any form of frequent control. Their discovery of occurrence of the AZE was deemed counterintuitive and referred to as "a watched pot boils quicker". In their theory, both the QZE and the AZE are obtained from the universal Kofman-Kurizki (KK) formula for decay and decoherence control, which has been experimentally tested in diverse systems and has influenced the development of control strategies in quantum information processing. This formula has shown that the QZE is key to the protection of quantum information from decoherence, whereas the AZE can facilitate the resetting of an open quantum system to its initial state following a quantum operation. Kurizki and coworkers showed that the AZE can yield a quantum advantage in the performance of fast-driven heat machines. They experimentally showed that the QZE can probe quantum noise properties of photons. They also proposed the protection of quantum transport in dissipative media by an effect akin to the QZE.

=== Control of quantum thermodynamics and thermal machines ===
Kurizki and coworkers showed the ability to control via the QZE and the AZE the temperature and entropy of open quantum systems: the QZE has been shown to heat up the system and the AZE to cool it down. This approach, referred to as "frequent measurements turn up the heat", has been experimentally employed to cool down (purify) thermal nuclear spin ensembles in solids. Kurizki and coworkers revealed the hitherto unnoticed hindering of quantum network purification by symmetry among its constituents and the ability to remove this hindering by symmetry breaking.

Kurizki and coworkers explored the thermodynamics of quantum systems under frequent control. As part of this approach they proposed the (minimal) quantum heat engine or refrigerator based on a single two-level atom. They showed that if the energy is supplied to the engine by a non-thermal bath, the engine efficiency can surpass the canonical Carnot limit and not adhere to the second law of thermodynamics. They recently proposed a heat engine based on a nonlinear optical device that operates, unlike all existing heat engines, as a fully coherent, closed system. They proposed the exotic possibility of driving the heat engine of a spaceship by radiation from a black hole.

=== Quantum noise sensing under control ===
Kurizki and coworkers developed an approach to quantum sensing that eludes the customary definitions of signal and noise. Unlike traditional sensing that aims at suppressing noise while retaining noise-free signals, their sensing focuses on bath-induced noise recorded by a quantum probe under frequent control. They showed that such noise carries information which can identify the processes that generate the noise. This noise-sensing approach is finding growing applications in biomedical diagnostics. Their colloquial summary of this approach is "the bath is more a friend than a foe". Among its applications for quantum sensing, they identified the ability of noise to provide information on quantum networks.

=== Quantum hybrid systems ===
Kurizki developed an approach that is being increasingly employed in quantum information processing: the use of quantum hybrid systems consisting of diverse modules, each performing a specific task suited for the advantageous functionality of that module.

=== Engineering macroscopic forces by quantum electrodynamics ===
Kurizki and coworkers showed that macroscopic forces between dipoles can be "engineered" by controlling the geometry of the quantum vacuum bath that confines them. Their notable discoveries within this approach include the generation of gravitational-like interactions in ultracold gases and giant long-range interactions of photons or dipoles in waveguides. These indicate that quantum electrodynamic effects, commonly associated with atomic scales, can be manifested and controlled also at macroscopic scales.

=== Measurements for probing and engineering quantum states and correlations ===
Kurizki and coworkers explored measuring the state of one of two coupled quantum systems as a means of engineering the state of the other. They showed that arbitrary quantum states of a light beam can be engineered by measuring atoms coupled to it or by counting the photons of another light beam correlated to it. They developed methods for measuring and quantifying quantum correlations of the kind discovered by Einstein, Podolsky and Rosen (EPR) in cold gases. and in dissociating molecules.

== Recognition and Awards ==
- Fellow, Optical Society of America (1999)
- Fellow, American Physical Society (2002)
- The W.E. Lamb Medal for Laser Science and Quantum Optics (Physics of Quantum Electronics, USA) (2008)
- The Humboldt-Meitner Award in Atomic and Molecular Physics (The Humboldt Foundation, Germany) (2009)
- Member, Academia Europaea (2023)

== Books ==
His book The Quantum Matrix (Oxford University Press, 2020), co-authored with Goren Gordon, pairs a graphic-novel narrative built around a quantum superhero named Henry Bar with underlying physics explanations. It renders scientific, philosophical and poetic descriptions of the world. A second book, Thermodynamics and Control of Open Quantum Systems (Cambridge University Press, 2022), co-authored with Abraham G. Kofman, is a 450-page treatment of open quantum systems and quantum thermodynamics, covering dynamical control, quantum measurements, decoherence, quantum heat engines, and quantum refrigerators, of particular interest to researchers working in the field.

== Poetry and philosophical writing ==
Alongside his scientific career, Gershon Kurizki has published philosophical essays combined with poetry in literary and philosophical magazines and books:

In the literary-philosophical magazine The New Rainbow (Keshet hahadasha):

- "On the reality of time" 11 (2005)
- "Rapture at the sight of an atom" 14 (2005)
- "On infinity and eternity - when will Achilles overtake the turtle?" 16 (2006)
- "Redemption through wisdom - Spinoza's gospel and science" 19 (2007)
- "The observer and the world" 21 (2007)

His book The Quantum Matrix similarly combines scientific ideas with narrative and philosophical elements.
