= Positive map =

The term positive map may refer to:

- Positive-definite functions in classical analysis
- Choi's theorem on completely positive maps between C^{*}-algebras (pronounced "C-star algebra")
