= Quantum process =

Time evolution of quantum systems

In quantum mechanics, a quantum process is a somewhat ambiguous term which usually refers to the time evolution of an (open) quantum system. Under very general assumptions, a quantum process is described by the quantum operation formalism (also known as a quantum dynamical map), which is a linear, trace-preserving, and completely positive map from the set of density matrices to itself.

For instance, in quantum process tomography, the unknown quantum process is assumed to be a quantum operation.

However, not all quantum processes can be captured within the quantum operation formalism; in principle, the density matrix of a quantum system can undergo completely arbitrary time evolution.
