= Unital map =

Mapping preserving identity

In abstract algebra, a unital map on a C*-algebra is a map $\phi$ which preserves the identity element:

$$\phi ( I ) = I.$$

This condition appears often in the context of completely positive maps, especially when they represent quantum operations.

If $\phi$ is completely positive, it can always be represented as

$$\phi ( \rho ) = \sum_i E_i \rho E_i^\dagger.$$

(The $E_i$ are the Kraus operators associated with $\phi$). In this case, the unital condition can be expressed as

$$\sum_i E_i E_i ^\dagger= I.$$
