= Quantum depolarizing channel =

Model for quantum noise in quantum systems

A quantum depolarizing channel is a model for quantum noise in quantum systems. The $d$-dimensional depolarizing channel can be viewed as a completely positive trace-preserving map $\Delta_\lambda$, depending on one parameter $\lambda$, which maps a state $\rho$ onto a linear combination of itself and the maximally mixed state,

$$\Delta_\lambda(\rho)=(1-\lambda)\rho+\frac{\lambda}{d}(\mathrm{tr}(\rho))I=(1-\lambda)\rho+\frac{\lambda}{d}I.$$

The condition of complete positivity requires $\lambda$ to satisfy the bounds

$$0\le\lambda\le 1+\frac{1}{d^2-1}.$$

== Qubit channel ==
The single qubit depolarizing channel has operator-sum representation on a density matrix $\rho$ given by

$$\Delta_\lambda(\rho) = \sum_{i=0}^3 K_i \rho K_i^\dagger,$$

where $K_i$ are the Kraus operators given by

$$K_0 = \sqrt{1-\frac{3\lambda}{4}} I, K_1 = \sqrt{\frac{\lambda}{4}} X, K_2 = \sqrt{\frac{\lambda}{4}} Y, K_3 = \sqrt{\frac{\lambda}{4}} Z$$

and $\{I,X,Y,Z\}$ are the Pauli matrices. The trace preserving condition is satisfied by the fact that $\sum_{i}K_i ^\dagger K_i = I.$

Geometrically the depolarizing channel $\Delta_\lambda$ can be interpreted as a uniform contraction of the Bloch sphere, parameterized by $\lambda$. In the case where $\lambda=1$ the channel returns the maximally-mixed state for any input state $\rho$, which corresponds of the complete contraction of the Bloch-sphere down to the single-point $\frac{I}{2}$ given by the origin.

== Classical capacity ==
The HSW theorem states that the classical capacity of a quantum channel $\Psi$ can be characterized as its regularized Holevo information:

$$\lim_{n\to\infty}\frac{1}{n}\chi(\Psi^{\otimes n}).$$

This quantity is difficult to compute and this reflects our ignorance on quantum channels. However, if the Holevo information is additive for a channel $\Psi$, i.e.,

$$\chi(\Psi\otimes\Psi)=\chi(\Psi)+\chi(\Psi).$$

Then we can get its classical capacity by computing the Holevo information of the channel.

The additivity of Holevo information for all channels was a famous open conjecture in quantum information theory, but it is now known that this conjecture doesn't hold in general. This was proved by showing that the additivity of minimum output entropy for all channels doesn't hold, which is an equivalent conjecture.

Nonetheless, the additivity of the Holevo information is shown to hold for the quantum depolarizing channel, and an outline of the proof is given below. As a consequence, entanglement across multiple uses of the channel cannot increase the classical capacity. In this sense, the channel behaves like a classical channel. To achieve the optimal rate of communication, it suffices to choose an orthonormal basis to encode the message, and perform measurements that project onto to the same basis at the receiving end.

=== Outline of the proof of the additivity of Holevo information ===
The additivity of Holevo information for the depolarizing channel was proved by Christopher King. He showed that the maximum output ''p''-norm of the depolarizing channel is multiplicative, which implied the additivity of the minimum output entropy, which is equivalent to the additivity of the Holevo information.

A stronger version of the additivity of the Holevo information is shown for the depolarizing channel $\Delta_\lambda$. For any channel $\Psi,$

$$\chi(\Delta_\lambda\otimes\Psi)=\chi(\Delta_\lambda)+\chi(\Psi).$$

This is implied by the following multiplicativity of maximum output p-norm (denoted as $v_p$):

$$v_p(\Delta_\lambda\otimes\Psi)=v_p(\Delta_\lambda)v_p(\Psi).$$

The greater than or equal to direction of the above is trivial, it suffices to take the tensor product the states that achieve the maximum p-norm for $\Delta_\lambda$ and $\Psi$ respectively, and input the product state into the product channel to get the output p-norm $v_p(\Delta_\lambda)v_p(\Psi)$. The proof for the other direction is more involved

The main idea of the proof is to rewrite the depolarizing channel as a convex combination of simpler channels, and use properties of those simpler channels to get the multiplicativity of the maximum output p-norm for the depolarizing channel.

It turns out that we can write the depolarizing channel as follows:

$$\Delta_\lambda(\rho)=\sum_{n=1}^{2d^2(d+1)}c_nU_n^*\Phi_\lambda^{(n)}(\rho)Un$$

where $c_n$'s are positive numbers, $U_n$'s are unitary matrices, $\Phi^{(n)}_\lambda$'s are some dephasing channels and $\rho$ is an arbitrary input state.

Therefore, the product channel can be written as

$$\left(\Delta_\lambda\otimes\Psi\right)(\rho)=\sum_{n=1}^{2d^2(d+1)}c_n(U_n^*\otimes I) \left(\Phi_\lambda^{(n)}\otimes\Psi\right)(\rho)\left(U_n\otimes I\right).$$

By the convexity and the unitary invariance of the p-norm, it suffices to show the simpler bound

$$\left\|\left(\Phi^{(n)}_\lambda\otimes\Psi\right)(\rho)\right\|_p\le v_p(\Delta_\lambda)v_p(\Psi).$$

One important mathematical tool used in the proof of this bound is the Lieb–Thirring inequality, which provides a bound for p-norm of a product of positive matrices. The details and the calculations of the proof are skipped, interested readers are referred to the paper of C. King mentioned above.

=== Discussion ===
The main technique used in this proof, namely rewriting the channel of interest as a convex combination of other simpler channels, is a generalization of the method used earlier to prove similar results for unital qubit channels.

The fact that the classical capacity of the depolarizing channel is equal to the Holevo information of the channel means that we can't really use quantum effects such as entanglement to improve the transmission rate of classical information. In this sense, the depolarizing channel can be treated as a classical channel.

However the fact that the additivity of Holevo information doesn't hold in general proposes some areas of future work, namely finding channels that violates the additivity, in other words, channels that can exploit quantum effects to improve the classical capacity beyond its Holevo information.
