= Quantum channel =

Foundational object in quantum communication theory

In quantum information theory, a quantum channel is a communication channel that can transmit quantum information, as well as classical information. An example of quantum information is the general dynamics of a qubit. An example of classical information is a text document transmitted over the Internet.

Terminologically, quantum channels are completely positive (CP) trace-preserving maps between spaces of operators. In other words, a quantum channel is just a quantum operation viewed not merely as the reduced dynamics of a system but as a pipeline intended to carry quantum information. (Some authors use the term "quantum operation" to include trace-decreasing maps while reserving "quantum channel" for strictly trace-preserving maps.)

== Memoryless quantum channel ==
We will assume for the moment that all state spaces of the systems considered, classical or quantum, are finite-dimensional.

The memoryless in the section title carries the same meaning as in classical information theory: the output of a channel at a given time depends only upon the corresponding input and not any previous ones.

=== Schrödinger picture ===
Consider quantum channels that transmit only quantum information. This is precisely a quantum operation, whose properties we now summarize.

Let $H_A$ and $H_B$ be the state spaces (finite-dimensional Hilbert spaces) of the sending and receiving ends, respectively, of a channel. $L(H_A)$ will denote the family of operators on $H_A.$ In the Schrödinger picture, a purely quantum channel is a map $\Phi$ between density matrices acting on $H_A$ and $H_B$ with the following properties:

1. As required by postulates of quantum mechanics, $\Phi$ needs to be linear.
2. Since density matrices are positive, $\Phi$ must preserve the cone of positive elements. In other words, $\Phi$ is a positive map.
3. If an ancilla of arbitrary finite dimension n is coupled to the system, then the induced map $I_n \otimes \Phi,$ where I_{n} is the identity map on the ancilla, must also be positive. Therefore, it is required that $I_n \otimes \Phi$ is positive for all n. Such maps are called completely positive.
4. Density matrices are specified to have trace 1, so $\Phi$ has to preserve the trace.

The adjectives completely positive and trace preserving used to describe a map are sometimes abbreviated CPTP. In the literature, sometimes the fourth property is weakened so that $\Phi$ is only required to be not trace-increasing. In this article, it will be assumed that all channels are CPTP.

=== Heisenberg picture ===
Density matrices acting on H_{A} only constitute a proper subset of the operators on H_{A} and same can be said for system B. However, once a linear map $\Phi$ between the density matrices is specified, a standard linearity argument, together with the finite-dimensional assumption, allow us to extend $\Phi$ uniquely to the full space of operators. This leads to the adjoint map $\Phi^*$, which describes the action of $\Phi$ in the Heisenberg picture:

The spaces of operators L(H_{A}) and L(H_{B}) are Hilbert spaces with the Hilbert–Schmidt inner product. Therefore, viewing $\Phi : L(H_A) \rightarrow L(H_B)$ as a map between Hilbert spaces, we obtain its adjoint $\Phi$^{*} given by

$$\langle A , \Phi(\rho) \rangle = \langle \Phi^*(A) , \rho \rangle .$$

While $\Phi$ takes states on A to those on B, $\Phi^*$ maps observables on system B to observables on A. This relationship is same as that between the Schrödinger and Heisenberg descriptions of dynamics. The measurement statistics remain unchanged whether the observables are considered fixed while the states undergo operation or vice versa.

It can be directly checked that if $\Phi$ is assumed to be trace preserving, $\Phi^*$ is unital, that is,$\Phi^*(I) = I$. Physically speaking, this means that, in the Heisenberg picture, the trivial observable remains trivial after applying the channel.

=== Classical information ===
So far we have only defined a quantum channel that transmits only quantum information. As stated in the introduction, the input and output of a channel can include classical information as well. To describe this, the formulation given so far needs to be generalized somewhat. A purely quantum channel, in the Heisenberg picture, is a linear map Ψ between spaces of operators:

$$\Psi : L(H_B) \rightarrow L(H_A)$$

that is unital and completely positive (CP). The operator spaces can be viewed as finite-dimensional C*-algebras. Therefore, we can say a channel is a unital CP map between C*-algebras:

$$\Psi : \mathcal{B} \rightarrow \mathcal{A}.$$

Classical information can then be included in this formulation. The observables of a classical system can be assumed to be a commutative C*-algebra, i.e. the space of continuous functions $C(X)$ on some set $X$. We assume $X$ is finite so $C(X)$ can be identified with the n-dimensional Euclidean space $\mathbb{R}^n$ with entry-wise multiplication.

Therefore, in the Heisenberg picture, if the classical information is part of, say, the input, we would define $\mathcal{B}$ to include the relevant classical observables. An example of this would be a channel

$$\Psi : L(H_B) \otimes C(X) \rightarrow L(H_A).$$

Notice $L(H_B) \otimes C(X)$ is still a C*-algebra. An element $a$ of a C*-algebra $\mathcal{A}$ is called positive if $a = x^{*} x$ for some $x$. Positivity of a map is defined accordingly. This characterization is not universally accepted; the quantum instrument is sometimes given as the generalized mathematical framework for conveying both quantum and classical information. In axiomatizations of quantum mechanics, the classical information is carried in a Frobenius algebra or Frobenius category.

== Examples ==
=== Time evolution ===
For a purely quantum system, the time evolution, at certain time t, is given by

$$\rho \rightarrow U \rho \;U^*,$$

where $U = e^{-iH t/\hbar}$ and H is the Hamiltonian and t is the time. This gives a CPTP map in the Schrödinger picture and is therefore a channel. The dual map in the Heisenberg picture is

$$A \rightarrow U^* A U.$$

=== Restriction ===
Consider a composite quantum system with state space $H_A \otimes H_B.$ For a state

$$\rho \in H_A \otimes H_B,$$

the reduced state of ρ on system A, ρ^{A}, is obtained by taking the partial trace of ρ with respect to the B system:

$$\rho ^A = \operatorname{Tr}_B \; \rho.$$

The partial trace operation is a CPTP map, therefore a quantum channel in the Schrödinger picture. In the Heisenberg picture, the dual map of this channel is

$$A \rightarrow A \otimes I_B,$$

where A is an observable of system A.

=== Observable ===
An observable associates a numerical value $f_i \in \mathbb{C}$ to a quantum mechanical effect $F_i$. $F_i$'s are assumed to be positive operators acting on appropriate state space and $\sum_i F_i = I$. (Such a collection is called a POVM.) In the Heisenberg picture, the corresponding observable map $\Psi$ maps a classical observable

$$f = \begin{bmatrix} f_1 \\ \vdots \\ f_n \end{bmatrix} \in C(X)$$

to the quantum mechanical one

$$\; \Psi (f) = \sum_i f_i F_i.$$

In other words, one integrates f against the POVM to obtain the quantum mechanical observable. It can be easily checked that $\Psi$ is CP and unital.

The corresponding Schrödinger map $\Psi^*$ takes density matrices to classical states:

$$\Psi (\rho) = \begin{bmatrix} \langle F_1, \rho  \rangle \\ \vdots \\ \langle F_n, \rho \rangle \end{bmatrix},$$

where the inner product is the Hilbert–Schmidt inner product. Furthermore, viewing states as normalized functionals, and invoking the Riesz representation theorem, we can put

$$\Psi (\rho) = \begin{bmatrix} \rho (F_1) \\ \vdots \\ \rho (F_n) \end{bmatrix}.$$

=== Instrument ===
The observable map, in the Schrödinger picture, has a purely classical output algebra and therefore only describes measurement statistics. To take the state change into account as well, we define what is called a quantum instrument. Let $\{ F_1, \dots, F_n \}$ be the effects (POVM) associated to an observable. In the Schrödinger picture, an instrument is a map $\Phi$ with pure quantum input $\rho \in L(H)$ and with output space $C(X) \otimes L(H)$:

$$\Phi (\rho) =  \begin{bmatrix} \rho(F_1) \cdot F_1 \\ \vdots \\ \rho(F_n) \cdot F_n \end{bmatrix}.$$

Let

$$f =  \begin{bmatrix} f_1 \\ \vdots \\ f_n \end{bmatrix} \in C(X).$$

The dual map in the Heisenberg picture is

$$\Psi (f \otimes A) =  \begin{bmatrix} f_1 \Psi_1(A) \\ \vdots \\ f_n \Psi_n(A)\end{bmatrix}$$

where $\Psi_i$ is defined in the following way: Factor $F_i = M_i ^2$ (this can always be done since elements of a POVM are positive) then $\; \Psi_i (A) = M_i A M_i$. We see that $\Psi$ is CP and unital.

Notice that $\Psi (f \otimes I)$ gives precisely the observable map. The map

$${\tilde \Psi}(A)= \sum_i \Psi_i (A) = \sum _i M_i A M_i$$

describes the overall state change.

=== Measure-and-prepare channel ===
Suppose two parties A and B wish to communicate in the following manner: A performs the measurement of an observable and communicates the measurement outcome to B classically. According to the message he receives, B prepares his (quantum) system in a specific state. In the Schrödinger picture, the first part of the channel $\Phi$_{1} simply consists of A making a measurement, i.e. it is the observable map:

$$\; \Phi_1 (\rho) = \begin{bmatrix} \rho(F_1) \\ \vdots \\ \rho(F_n)\end{bmatrix}.$$

If, in the event of the i-th measurement outcome, B prepares his system in state R_{i}, the second part of the channel $\Phi$_{2} takes the above classical state to the density matrix

$$\Phi_2 \left(\begin{bmatrix} \rho(F_1) \\ \vdots \\ \rho(F_n)\end{bmatrix}\right) = \sum _i \rho (F_i) R_i.$$

The total operation is the composition

$$\Phi (\rho)= \Phi_2 \circ \Phi_1 (\rho) = \sum _i \rho (F_i) R_i.$$

Channels of this form are called measure-and-prepare or entanglement-breaking.

In the Heisenberg picture, the dual map $\Phi^* = \Phi_1^* \circ \Phi_2 ^*$ is defined by

$$\; \Phi^* (A) = \sum_i R_i(A) F_i.$$

A measure-and-prepare channel can not be the identity map. This is precisely the statement of the no teleportation theorem, which says classical teleportation (not to be confused with entanglement-assisted teleportation) is impossible. In other words, a quantum state can not be measured reliably.

In the channel-state duality, a channel is measure-and-prepare if and only if the corresponding state is separable. Actually, all the states that result from the partial action of a measure-and-prepare channel are separable, which is why measure-and-prepare channels are also known as entanglement-breaking channels.

=== Pure channel ===
Consider the case of a purely quantum channel $\Psi$ in the Heisenberg picture. With the assumption that everything is finite-dimensional, $\Psi$ is a unital CP map between spaces of matrices

$$\Psi : \mathbb{C}^{n \times n} \rightarrow \mathbb{C}^{m \times m}.$$

By Choi's theorem on completely positive maps, $\Psi$ must take the form

$$\Psi (A) = \sum_{i = 1}^N K_i A K_i^*$$

where N ≤ nm. The matrices K_{i} are called Kraus operators of $\Psi$ (after the German physicist Karl Kraus, who introduced them). The minimum number of Kraus operators is called the Kraus rank of $\Psi$. A channel with Kraus rank 1 is called pure. The time evolution is one example of a pure channel. This terminology again comes from the channel-state duality. A channel is pure if and only if its dual state is a pure state.

=== Teleportation ===
In quantum teleportation, a sender wishes to transmit an arbitrary quantum state of a particle to a possibly distant receiver. Consequently, the teleportation process is a quantum channel. The apparatus for the process itself requires a quantum channel for the transmission of one particle of an entangled-state to the receiver. Teleportation occurs by a joint measurement of the sent particle and the remaining entangled particle. This measurement results in classical information that must be sent to the receiver to complete the teleportation. Importantly, the classical information can be sent after the quantum channel has ceased to exist.

== In the experimental setting ==
Experimentally, a simple implementation of a quantum channel is fiber optic (or free-space for that matter) transmission of single photons. Single photons can be transmitted up to 100 km in standard fiber optics before losses dominate. The photon's time-of-arrival (time-bin entanglement) or polarization are used as a basis to encode quantum information for purposes such as quantum cryptography. The channel is capable of transmitting not only basis states (e.g. $|0\rangle$, $|1\rangle$) but also superpositions of them (e.g. $|0\rangle+|1\rangle$). The coherence of the state is maintained during transmission through the channel. Contrast this with the transmission of electrical pulses through wires (a classical channel), where only classical information (e.g. 0s and 1s) can be sent.

== Channel capacity ==
=== The cb-norm of a channel ===
Before giving the definition of channel capacity, the preliminary notion of the norm of complete boundedness, or cb-norm of a channel needs to be discussed. When considering the capacity of a channel $\Phi$, we need to compare it with an "ideal channel" $\Lambda$ . For instance, when the input and output algebras are identical, we can choose $\Lambda$ to be the identity map. Such a comparison requires a metric between channels. Since a channel can be viewed as a linear operator, it is tempting to use the natural operator norm. In other words, the closeness of $\Phi$ to the ideal channel $\Lambda$ can be defined by

$$\| \Phi - \Lambda \| = \sup \{ \| (\Phi - \Lambda)(A)\|  \;|\;  \|A\| \leq 1 \}.$$

However, the operator norm may increase when we tensor $\Phi$ with the identity map on some ancilla.

To make the operator norm even a more undesirable candidate, the quantity

$$\| \Phi \otimes I_n \|$$

may increase without bound as $n \rightarrow \infty.$ The solution is to introduce, for any linear map $\Phi$ between C*-algebras, the cb-norm

$$\| \Phi \|_{cb} = \sup _n \| \Phi \otimes I_n \|.$$

=== Definition of channel capacity ===
The mathematical model of a channel used here is same as the classical one.

Let $\Psi :\mathcal{B}_1 \rightarrow \mathcal{A}_1$ be a channel in the Heisenberg picture and $\Psi_{id} : \mathcal{B}_2 \rightarrow \mathcal{A}_2$ be a chosen ideal channel. To make the comparison possible, one needs to encode and decode Φ via appropriate devices, i.e. we consider the composition

$${\hat \Psi} = D \circ \Phi \circ E : \mathcal{B}_2 \rightarrow \mathcal{A}_2$$

where E is an encoder and D is a decoder. In this context, E and D are unital CP maps with appropriate domains. The quantity of interest is the best case scenario:

$$\Delta ({\hat \Psi}, \Psi_{id}) = \inf_{E,D} \| {\hat \Psi} - \Psi_{id} \|_{cb}$$

with the infimum being taken over all possible encoders and decoders.

To transmit words of length n, the ideal channel is to be applied n times, so we consider the tensor power

$$\Psi_{id}^{\otimes n} = \Psi_{id} \otimes \cdots \otimes \Psi_{id}.$$

The $\otimes$ operation describes n inputs undergoing the operation $\Psi_{id}$ independently and is the quantum mechanical counterpart of concatenation. Similarly, m invocations of the channel corresponds to ${\hat \Psi} ^{\otimes m}$.

The quantity

$$\Delta ( {\hat \Psi}^{\otimes m}, \Psi_{id}^{\otimes n} )$$

is therefore a measure of the ability of the channel to transmit words of length n faithfully by being invoked m times.

This leads to the following definition:

A non-negative real number r is an achievable rate of $\Psi$ with respect to $\Psi_{id}$ if

For all sequences $\{ n_{\alpha} \}, \{ m_{\alpha} \} \subset \mathbb{N}$ where $m_{\alpha}\rightarrow \infty$ and $\lim \sup _{\alpha} (n_{\alpha}/m_{\alpha}) < r$, we have

$$\lim_{\alpha} \Delta ( {\hat \Psi}^{\otimes m_{\alpha}}, \Psi_{id}^{\otimes n_{\alpha}} ) = 0.$$

A sequence $\{ n_{\alpha} \}$ can be viewed as representing a message consisting of possibly infinite number of words. The limit supremum condition in the definition says that, in the limit, faithful transmission can be achieved by invoking the channel no more than r times the length of a word. One can also say that r is the number of letters per invocation of the channel that can be sent without error.

The channel capacity of $\Psi$ with respect to $\Psi_{id}$, denoted by $\;C(\Psi, \Psi_{id})$ is the supremum of all achievable rates.

From the definition, it is vacuously true that 0 is an achievable rate for any channel.

=== Important examples ===
As stated before, for a system with observable algebra $\mathcal{B}$, the ideal channel $\Psi_{id}$ is by definition the identity map $I_{\mathcal{B}}$. Thus for a purely n dimensional quantum system, the ideal channel is the identity map on the space of n × n matrices $\mathbb{C}^{n \times n}$. As a slight abuse of notation, this ideal quantum channel will be also denoted by $\mathbb{C}^{n \times n}$. Similarly, a classical system with output algebra $\mathbb{C}^m$ will have an ideal channel denoted by the same symbol. We can now state some fundamental channel capacities.

The channel capacity of the classical ideal channel $\mathbb{C}^m$ with respect to a quantum ideal channel $\mathbb{C}^{n \times n}$ is

$$C(\mathbb{C}^m, \mathbb{C}^{n \times n}) = 0.$$

This is equivalent to the no-teleportation theorem: it is impossible to transmit quantum information via a classical channel.

Moreover, the following equalities hold:

$$C(\mathbb{C}^m, \mathbb{C}^n) = C(\mathbb{C}^{m \times m}, \mathbb{C}^{n \times n})
= C( \mathbb{C}^{m \times m}, \mathbb{C}^{n} ) = \frac{\log n}{\log m}.$$

The above says, for instance, an ideal quantum channel is no more efficient at transmitting classical information than an ideal classical channel. When n = m, the best one can achieve is one bit per qubit.

It is relevant to note here that both of the above bounds on capacities can be broken, with the aid of entanglement. The entanglement-assisted teleportation scheme allows one to transmit quantum information using a classical channel. Superdense coding achieves two bits per qubit. These results indicate the significant role played by entanglement in quantum communication.

=== Classical and quantum channel capacities ===
Using the same notation as the previous subsection, the classical capacity of a channel Ψ is

$$C(\Psi, \mathbb{C}^2),$$

that is, it is the capacity of Ψ with respect to the ideal channel on the classical one-bit system $\mathbb{C}^2$.

Similarly the quantum capacity of Ψ is

$$C(\Psi, \mathbb{C}^{2 \times 2}),$$

where the reference system is now the one qubit system $\mathbb{C}^{2 \times 2}$.

== Channel fidelity ==
Another measure of how well a quantum channel preserves information is called channel fidelity, and it arises from fidelity of quantum states. Given two pure states $|\psi\rangle$ and $|\phi\rangle$, their fidelity is the probability that one of them passes a test designed to identify the other:
$$F(|\psi\rangle, |\phi\rangle) = |\langle \psi | \phi \rangle|^2.$$
This can be generalized to the case where the two states being compared are given by density matrices:
$$F(\rho, \sigma) = \left(\mathrm{tr} \sqrt{\sqrt{\rho} \sigma \sqrt{\rho}}\right)^2.$$

The channel fidelity for a given channel is found by sending one half of a maximally entangled pair of systems through that channel, and calculating the fidelity between the resulting state and the original input.

== Bistochastic quantum channel ==
A bistochastic quantum channel is a quantum channel $\Phi(\rho)$ that is unital, i.e. $\Phi(I) = I$. These channels include unitary evolutions, convex combinations of unitaries, and (in dimensions larger than 2) other possibilities as well.

== See also ==
- No-communication theorem
- Amplitude damping channel
- Quantum depolarizing channel
