= Karl Kraus (physicist) =

German theoretical physicist

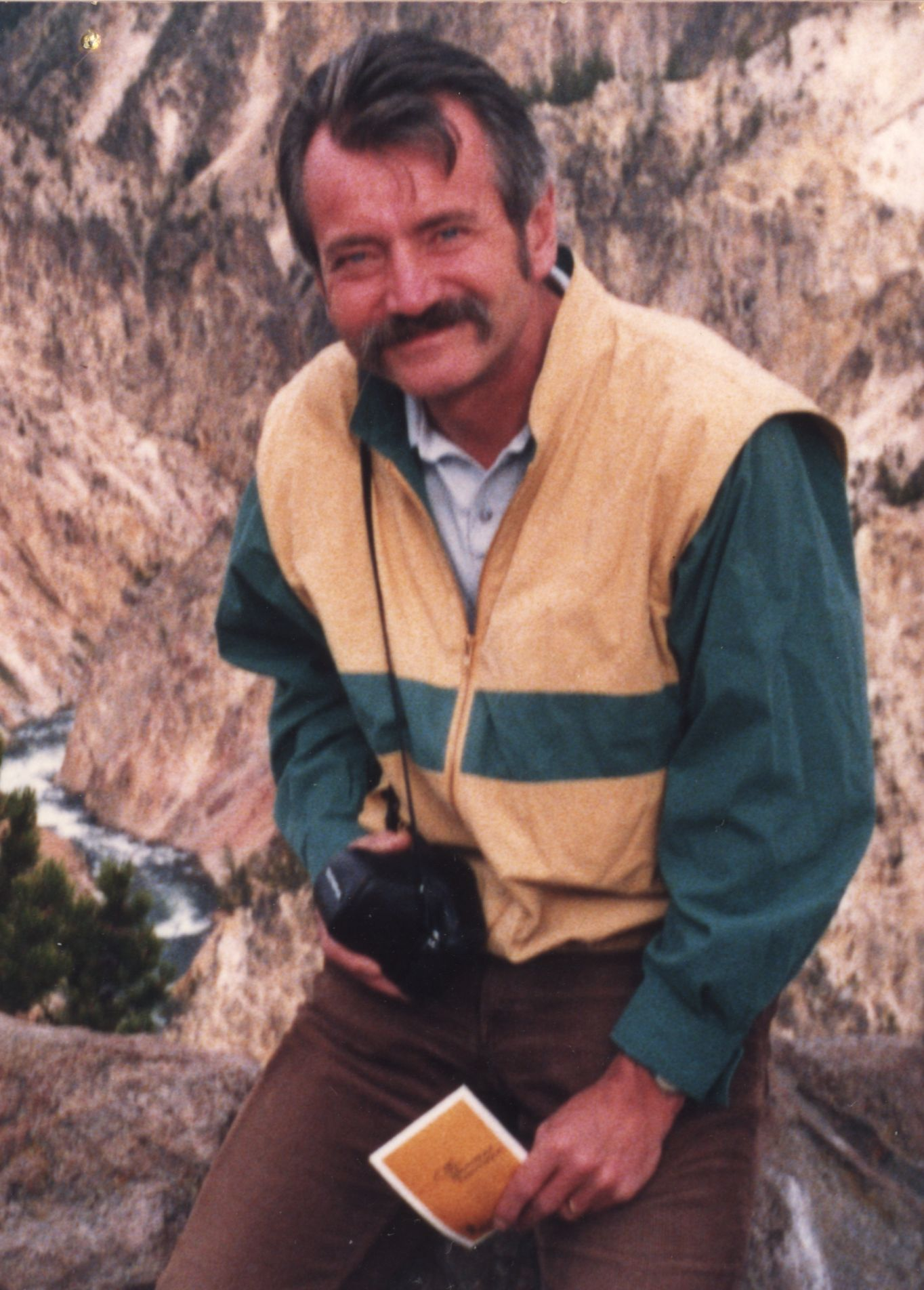
- Karl Kraus, 1984
- Born: 21 March 1938; Hohenelbe, Czechoslovakia
- Died: 9 June 1988 (aged 50); Würzburg, Germany
- Citizenship: German
- Education: Free University of Berlin
- Known for: Kraus operator
- Scientific career
- Fields: Theoretical Physics
- Workplaces: University of Marburg; University of Würzburg
- Doctoral advisor: Kurt Just

Karl Kraus (21 March 1938 – 9 June 1988) was a German theoretical physicist who made major contributions to the foundations of quantum physics. He is known for his work in quantum operations, where Kraus operators are named after him.

== Life ==
Kraus was born in 1938 in Hohenelbe/Giant Mountains, today Vrchlabí. After the war, he grew up in Elsterwerda and attended local schools. He studied physics from 1955 to 1960 at the Humboldt University of Berlin (East) and the Free University of Berlin (West). He graduated in 1962 with a thesis about Lorentz's theory of gravity, carried out under the supervision of Kurt Just. Kraus then joined as an assistant to Günther Ludwig at the University of Marburg, where he qualified in 1966. In 1971, he accepted a professorship at the Institute of Physics of the University of Würzburg, where he established a mathematical physics working group on the topic of the foundations of quantum theory. In 1980 Kraus spent a sabbatical year at UT Austin with John Archibald Wheeler, Arno Böhm, George Sudarshan, William Wootters, and Wojciech Zurek.

Karl Kraus died in 1988 at age 50 from the effects of cancer.

== Work ==
Kraus work focused on the connection between the quantum non-locality and the locality of the classical world. He did work on this topic covering the Einstein–Podolsky–Rosen effect and issues regarding the measurement problem in quantum theory, a problem which, in his opinion, was largely ignored in the Copenhagen interpretation by the founders of quantum theory.

Some of Kraus' important publications on the measurement problem in quantum theory were:

- Measuring processes in quantum mechanics I: Continuous observation and the watchdog effect.
- Measuring processes in quantum mechanics II: The classical behavior of measuring instruments.
- States, Effects, and Operations.

=== Kraus representation and Kraus operators ===
In his 1983 book States, Effects, and Operations, Kraus described the measurement process in quantum mechanics for the first time using the concept and mathematical formalism of a quantum operation, a special class of maps of density operators. The representation he used for these maps is now known as the Kraus representation, Kraus operator formalism or operator-sum formalism, and is now frequently used in the field of quantum information. The Kraus representation is based on Stinespring dilation theorem about completely positive images of finite-dimensional C*-algebras. For a modern proof of the Kraus representation, which is based on Choi's theorem on completely positive maps instead of Stinespring's set, see Quantum Computation and Quantum Information.

The issues discussed by Kraus regarding the foundations of quantum theory are still a current area of research. New theoretical advances are discussed in Erich Joos, H. Dieter Zeh, Claus Kiefer, Domenico Giulini, J. Kupsch, I.-O. Stamatescu. These decoherence theories have been combined with modern experiments, particularly those done by the groups of Serge Haroche at Paris and Anton Zeilinger at Innsbruck, Vienna), in an attempt to use the measurement process in quantum theory to better understand relationship between quantum and classical world.

In addition to mathematics and physics, Kraus had a special interest in biology, acquiring an extensive knowledge on the subject and even publishing some biological work.
