= W. Forrest Stinespring =

American mathematician

William Forrest "Woody" Stinespring (16 March 1929, Charlottesville, Virginia – 15 May 2012) was an American mathematician, specializing in operator theory. He is known for the Stinespring factorization theorem.

While studying in Harvard University, Stinespring twice became a Putnam fellow, in 1947 and 1949. After graduating from Harvard University with a bachelor's degree, Stinespring received his Ph.D. from the University of Chicago in 1957. His thesis Integration for gages and duality theorems was written under the supervision of Irving Segal. Stinespring was a visiting scholar at the Institute for Advanced Study from 1957 to 1959. After teaching at the University of Illinois at Urbana-Champaign, MIT, and the University of Chicago, he became in 1966 a professor at the University of Illinois at Chicago, retiring there as professor emeritus in 1999. He wrote 7 papers with David Shale.

According to William Arveson:

The first penetration into noncommutative Banach space theory was made (perhaps inadvertently) by W. Forrest Stinespring in the mid-fifties [Sti55]. Stinespring wanted to explain two rather different representation theorems in terms of a more general construction. His theorem was seen as a nice bit of work, but a piece of work that was peculiar enough that while many functional analysts learned it in their graduate courses in Chicago, Berkeley, UCLA and Penn, they did not really take it in as part of their toolkit. Indeed, this theorem was not fully appreciated for fifteen years, and even after it was fully understood, it was slow to make an impact in the larger community.

W. Forrest Stinespring's father was William Franklin Stinespring (1901–1991), who was a professor at Duke University Divinity School from 1936 to 1971.

== Selected publications ==
- Stinespring, W. Forrest (1955). "Positive Functions on C^{∗}-Algebras". Proceedings of the American Mathematical Society. 6 (2): 211–216. doi:10.2307/2032342. JSTOR 2032342. (This article has over 1600 citations.)
- "A sufficient condition for an integral operator to have a trace". J. Reine Angew. Math. 200: 200–207. 1958.
- Stinespring, W. Forrest (1958). "A semi-simple matrix group is of type $I$". Proceedings of the American Mathematical Society. 9 (6): 965. doi:10.1090/S0002-9939-1958-0104756-2.
- Nelson, Edward; Stinespring, W. Forrest (1959). "Representation of Elliptic Operators in an Enveloping Algebra". American Journal of Mathematics. 81 (3): 547. doi:10.2307/2372913. JSTOR 2372913. 1959 (translated into Russian by S. G. Gindikin Matematika, 1961, volume 5, issue 3, pages 81–94)
- Stinespring, W. Forrest (1959). "Groups". Duke Mathematical Journal. 26: 123–131. doi:10.1215/S0012-7094-59-02611-0.
