= POVM =

Generalized measurement in quantum mechanics

In functional analysis and quantum information science, a positive operator-valued measure (POVM) is a measure whose values are positive semi-definite operators on a Hilbert space. POVMs are a generalization of projection-valued measures (PVM) and, correspondingly, quantum measurements described by POVMs are a generalization of quantum measurement described by PVMs (called projective measurements).

In rough analogy, a POVM is to a PVM what a mixed state is to a pure state. Mixed states are needed to specify the state of a subsystem of a larger system (see purification of quantum state); analogously, POVMs are necessary to describe the effect on a subsystem of a projective measurement performed on a larger system.

POVMs are the most general kind of measurement in quantum mechanics, and can also be used in quantum field theory. They are extensively used in the field of quantum information.

== Definition ==
Let $\mathcal{H}$ denote a Hilbert space and $(X, M)$ a measurable space with $M$ a Borel σ-algebra on $X$. A POVM is a function $F$ defined on $M$ whose values are positive bounded self-adjoint operators on $\mathcal{H}$ such that for every $\psi \in \mathcal{H}$

$$E \mapsto \langle F(E) \psi \mid \psi \rangle,$$

is a non-negative countably additive measure on the σ-algebra $M$ and $F(X) = \operatorname{I}_{\mathcal{H}}$ is the identity operator.

In quantum mechanics, the key property of a POVM is that it determines a probability measure on the outcome space, so that $\langle F(E) \psi \mid \psi \rangle$ can be interpreted as the probability of the event $E$ when measuring a quantum state $| \psi \rangle$.

In the simplest case, in which $X$ is a finite set, $M$ is the power set of $X$ and $\mathcal{H}$ is finite-dimensional, a POVM is equivalently a set of positive semi-definite Hermitian matrices $\{F_i\}$ that sum to the identity matrix,

$$\sum_{i=1}^n F_i = \operatorname{I}.$$

A POVM differs from a projection-valued measure in that, for projection-valued measures, the values of $F$ are required to be orthogonal projections.

In the discrete case, the POVM element $F_i$ is associated with the measurement outcome $i$, such that the probability of obtaining it when making a quantum measurement on the quantum state $\rho$ is given by

$$\text{Prob}(i) = \operatorname{tr}(\rho F_i)$$,

where $\operatorname{tr}$ is the trace operator. When the quantum state being measured is a pure state $|\psi\rangle$ this formula reduces to

$$\text{Prob}(i) = \operatorname{tr}(|\psi\rangle\langle\psi| F_i) = \langle\psi|F_i|\psi\rangle$$.

The discrete case of a POVM generalizes the simplest case of a PVM, which is a set of orthogonal projectors $\{\Pi_i\}$ that sum to the identity matrix:

$$\sum_{i=1}^N \Pi_i = \operatorname{I}, \quad \Pi_i \Pi_j = \delta_{i j} \Pi_i.$$

The probability formulas for a PVM are the same as for the POVM. An important difference is that the elements of a POVM are not necessarily orthogonal. As a consequence, the number of elements $n$ of the POVM can be larger than the dimension of the Hilbert space they act in. On the other hand, the number of elements $N$ of the PVM is at most the dimension of the Hilbert space.

== Naimark's dilation theorem ==
Note: An alternate spelling of this is "Neumark's Theorem"

Naimark's dilation theorem shows how POVMs can be obtained from PVMs acting on a larger space. This result is of critical importance in quantum mechanics, as it gives a way to physically realize POVM measurements.

In the simplest case, of a POVM with a finite number of elements acting on a finite-dimensional Hilbert space, Naimark's theorem says that if $\{F_i\}_{i=1}^n$ is a POVM acting on a Hilbert space $\mathcal{H}_A$ of dimension $d_A$, then there exists a PVM $\{\Pi_i\}_{i=1}^n$ acting on a Hilbert space $\mathcal{H}_{A'}$ of dimension $d_{A'}$ and an isometry $V : \mathcal{H}_A \to \mathcal{H}_{A'}$ such that for all $i$,

$$F_i = V^\dagger \Pi_i V.$$

For the particular case of a rank-1 POVM, i.e., when $F_i = |f_i\rangle\langle f_i|$ for some (unnormalized) vectors $|f_i\rangle$, this isometry can be constructed as

$$V = \sum_{i=1}^n |i\rangle_{A'}\langle f_i|_{A}$$

and the PVM is given simply by $\Pi_i = |i\rangle\langle i|_{A'}$. Note that here $d_{A'} = n$.

In the general case, the isometry and PVM can be constructed by defining $\mathcal{H}_{A'} = \mathcal{H}_{A}\otimes \mathcal{H}_{B}$, $\Pi_i = \operatorname{I}_A \otimes |i\rangle\langle i|_B$, and

$$V = \sum_{i=1}^n \sqrt{F_i}_A \otimes {|i\rangle}_B.$$

Note that here $d_{A'} = nd_A$, so this is a more wasteful construction.

In either case, the probability of obtaining outcome $i$ with this PVM, and the state suitably transformed by the isometry, is the same as the probability of obtaining it with the original POVM:

$$\text{Prob}(i) = \operatorname{tr}\left( V \rho_A V^\dagger \Pi_i \right)
= \operatorname{tr}\left( \rho_A V^\dagger \Pi_i V \right)
= \operatorname{tr}(\rho_A F_i)$$

This construction can be turned into a recipe for a physical realisation of the POVM by extending the isometry $V$ into a unitary $U$, that is, finding $U$ such that

$$V|i\rangle_A = U|i\rangle_{A'}$$

for $i$ from 1 to $d_A$. This can always be done.

The recipe for realizing the POVM described by $\{F_i\}_{i=1}^n$ on a quantum state $\rho$ is then to embed the quantum state in the Hilbert space $\mathcal{H}_{A'}$, evolve it with the unitary $U$, and make the projective measurement described by the PVM $\{\Pi_i\}_{i=1}^n$.

=== Post-measurement state ===
The post-measurement state is not determined by the POVM itself, but rather by the PVM that physically realizes it. Since there are infinitely many different PVMs that realize the same POVM, the operators $\{F_i\}_{i=1}^n$ alone do not determine what the post-measurement state will be. To see that, note that for any unitary $W$ the operators

$$M_i = W\sqrt{F_i}$$

will also have the property that $M_i^\dagger M_i = F_i$, so that using the isometry

$$V_W = \sum_{i=1}^n {M_i}_A \otimes {|i\rangle}_B$$

in the second construction above will also implement the same POVM. In the case where the state being measured is in a pure state $|\psi\rangle_A$, the resulting unitary $U_W$ takes it together with the ancilla to state

$$U_W(|\psi\rangle_A |0\rangle_B) = \sum_{i=1}^n M_i |\psi\rangle_A |i\rangle_B,$$

and the projective measurement on the ancilla will collapse $|\psi\rangle_A$ to the state

$$|\psi'\rangle_A = \frac{M_{i_0} |\psi\rangle}{\sqrt{\langle \psi |M_{i_0}^\dagger M_{i_0} | \psi \rangle}}$$

on obtaining result $i_0$. When the state being measured is described by a density matrix $\rho_A$, the corresponding post-measurement state is given by

$$\rho'_A = {M_{i_0} \rho M_{i_0}^\dagger \over {\rm tr}(M_{i_0} \rho M_{i_0}^\dagger)}$$.

We see therefore that the post-measurement state depends explicitly on the unitary $W$. Note that while $M_i^\dagger M_i = F_i$ is always Hermitian, generally, $M_i$ does not have to be Hermitian.

Another difference from the projective measurements is that a POVM measurement is in general not repeatable. If on the first measurement result $i_0$ was obtained, the probability of obtaining a different result $i_1$ on a second measurement is

$$\text{Prob}(i_1|i_0) = {\operatorname{tr}(M_{i_1}M_{i_0} \rho M_{i_0}^\dagger M_{i_1}^\dagger) \over {\rm tr}(M_{i_0} \rho M_{i_0}^\dagger)}$$,

which can be nonzero if $M_{i_0}$ and $M_{i_1}$ are not orthogonal. In a projective measurement these operators are always orthogonal and therefore the measurement is always repeatable.

== An example: unambiguous quantum state discrimination ==
Bloch sphere representation of states (in blue) and optimal POVM (in red) for unambiguous quantum state discrimination on the states $|\psi\rangle=|0\rangle$ and $|\varphi\rangle=\frac1{\sqrt2}(|0\rangle+|1\rangle)$. Note that on the Bloch sphere orthogonal states are antiparallel.

Suppose you have a quantum system with a 2-dimensional Hilbert space that you know is in either the state $|\psi\rangle$ or the state $|\varphi\rangle$, and you want to determine which one it is. If $|\psi\rangle$ and $|\varphi\rangle$ are orthogonal, this task is easy: the set $\{|\psi\rangle\langle\psi|,|\varphi\rangle\langle\varphi|\}$ will form a PVM, and a projective measurement in this basis will determine the state with certainty. If, however, $|\psi\rangle$ and $|\varphi\rangle$ are not orthogonal, this task is impossible, in the sense that there is no measurement, either PVM or POVM, that will distinguish them with certainty. The impossibility of perfectly discriminating between non-orthogonal states is the basis for quantum information protocols such as quantum cryptography, quantum coin flipping, and quantum money.

The task of unambiguous quantum state discrimination (UQSD) is the next best thing: to never make a mistake about whether the state is $|\psi\rangle$ or $|\varphi\rangle$, at the cost of sometimes having an inconclusive result. It is possible to do this with projective measurements. For example, if you measure the PVM $\{|\psi\rangle\langle\psi|,|\psi^\perp\rangle\langle\psi^\perp|\}$, where $|\psi^\perp\rangle$ is the quantum state orthogonal to $|\psi\rangle$, and obtain result $|\psi^\perp\rangle\langle\psi^\perp|$, then you know with certainty that the state was $|\varphi\rangle$. If the result was $|\psi\rangle\langle\psi|$, then it is inconclusive. The analogous reasoning holds for the PVM $\{|\varphi\rangle\langle\varphi|,|\varphi^\perp\rangle\langle\varphi^\perp|\}$, where $|\varphi^\perp\rangle$ is the state orthogonal to $|\varphi\rangle$.

This is unsatisfactory, though, as you can't detect both $|\psi\rangle$ and $|\varphi\rangle$ with a single measurement, and the probability of getting a conclusive result is smaller than with POVMs. The POVM that gives the highest probability of a conclusive outcome in this task is given by

$$F_{\psi}=\frac{1}{1+|\lang\varphi|\psi\rang|}|\varphi^\perp\rangle\langle\varphi^\perp|$$
$$F_{\varphi}=\frac{1}{1+|\lang\varphi|\psi\rang|}|\psi^\perp\rangle\langle\psi^\perp|$$
$$F_?= \operatorname{I}-F_{\psi}-F_{\varphi}= \frac{2|\lang\varphi|\psi\rang|}{1+|\lang\varphi|\psi\rang|} |\gamma\rangle\langle\gamma|,$$

where

$$|\gamma\rangle = \frac1{\sqrt{2(1+|\lang\varphi|\psi\rang|)}}(|\psi\rangle+e^{i\arg(\lang\varphi|\psi\rang)}|\varphi\rangle).$$

Note that $\operatorname{tr}(|\varphi\rangle\langle\varphi|F_{\psi}) = \operatorname{tr}(|\psi\rangle\langle\psi|F_{\varphi}) = 0$, so when outcome $\psi$ is obtained we are certain that the quantum state is $|\psi\rangle$, and when outcome $\varphi$ is obtained we are certain that the quantum state is $|\varphi\rangle$.

The probability of having a conclusive outcome is given by

$$1-|\lang\varphi|\psi\rang|,$$

when the quantum system is in state $|\psi\rangle$ or $|\varphi\rangle$ with the same probability. This result is known as the Ivanović-Dieks-Peres limit, named after the authors who pioneered UQSD research.

Since the POVMs are rank-1, we can use the simple case of the construction above to obtain a projective measurement that physically realises this POVM. Labelling the three possible states of the enlarged Hilbert space as $|\text{result ψ}\rangle$, $|\text{result φ}\rangle$, and $|\text{result ?}\rangle$, we see that the resulting unitary $U_\text{UQSD}$ takes the state $|\psi\rangle$ to

$$U_\text{UQSD}|\psi\rangle = \sqrt{1-|\lang\varphi|\psi\rang|}|\text{result ψ}\rangle + \sqrt{|\lang\varphi|\psi\rang|} |\text{result ?}\rangle,$$

and similarly it takes the state $|\varphi\rangle$ to

$$U_\text{UQSD}|\varphi\rangle = \sqrt{1-|\lang\varphi|\psi\rang|}|\text{result φ}\rangle + e^{-i\arg(\lang\varphi|\psi\rang)}\sqrt{|\lang\varphi|\psi\rang|}|\text{result ?}\rangle.$$

A projective measurement then gives the desired results with the same probabilities as the POVM.

This POVM has been used to experimentally distinguish non-orthogonal polarisation states of a photon. The realisation of the POVM with a projective measurement was slightly different from the one described here.

== See also ==
- SIC-POVM
- Quantum measurement
- Mathematical formulation of quantum mechanics
- Density matrix
- Quantum operation
- Projection-valued measure
- Vector measure
