= Choi's theorem on completely positive maps =

Classification of completely positive maps

In mathematics, Choi's theorem on completely positive maps is a result that classifies completely positive maps between finite-dimensional (matrix) C*-algebras. This 1975 theorem is due to Man-Duen Choi. An infinite-dimensional algebraic generalization of Choi's theorem is known as Belavkin's "Radon–Nikodym" theorem for completely positive maps.

== Statement ==
Choi's theorem. Let $\Phi : \mathbb{C}^{n\times n} \to \mathbb{C}^{m\times m}$ be a linear map. The following are equivalent:

(i) Φ is n-positive (i.e. $\left (\operatorname{id}_n\otimes\Phi \right )(A)\in\mathbb{C}^{n\times n}\otimes\mathbb{C}^{m\times m}$ is positive whenever $A\in\mathbb{C}^{n\times n}\otimes\mathbb{C}^{n\times n}$ is positive).
(ii) The matrix with operator entries

$$C_\Phi= \left (\operatorname{id}_n\otimes\Phi \right ) \left (\sum_{ij}E_{ij}\otimes E_{ij} \right ) = \sum_{ij}E_{ij}\otimes\Phi(E_{ij}) \in \mathbb{C} ^{nm \times nm}$$

is positive semi-definite (PSD), where $E_{ij} \in \mathbb{C}^{n\times n}$ is the matrix with 1 in the ij-th entry and 0s elsewhere. (The matrix C_{Φ} is sometimes called the Choi matrix of Φ.)
(iii) Φ is completely positive.

== Proof ==
=== (i) implies (ii) ===
We observe that if

$$E=\sum_{ij}E_{ij}\otimes E_{ij},$$

then E=E^{*} and E^{2}=nE, so E=n^{−1}EE^{*} which is positive. Therefore C_{Φ} =(I_{n} ⊗ Φ)(E) is positive by the n-positivity of Φ.

=== (iii) implies (i) ===
This holds trivially.

=== (ii) implies (iii) ===
This mainly involves chasing the different ways of looking at C^{nm×nm}:

$$\mathbb{C}^{nm\times nm}
\cong\mathbb{C}^{nm}\otimes(\mathbb{C}^{nm})^*
\cong\mathbb{C}^n\otimes\mathbb{C}^m\otimes(\mathbb{C}^n\otimes\mathbb{C}^m)^*
\cong\mathbb{C}^n\otimes(\mathbb{C}^n)^*\otimes\mathbb{C}^m\otimes(\mathbb{C}^m)^*
\cong\mathbb{C}^{n\times n}\otimes\mathbb{C}^{m\times m}.$$

Let the eigenvector decomposition of C_{Φ} be

$$C_\Phi = \sum _{i = 1} ^{nm} \lambda_i v_i v_i ^*,$$

where the vectors $v_i$ lie in C^{nm} . By assumption, each eigenvalue $\lambda_i$ is non-negative so we can absorb the eigenvalues in the eigenvectors and redefine $v_i$ so that

$$\; C_\Phi = \sum _{i = 1} ^{nm} v_i v_i ^* .$$

The vector space C^{nm} can be viewed as the direct sum $\textstyle \oplus_{i=1}^n \mathbb{C}^m$ compatibly with the above identification $\textstyle\mathbb{C}^{nm}\cong\mathbb{C}^n\otimes\mathbb{C}^m$ and the standard basis of C^{n}.

If P_{k} ∈ C^{m × nm} is projection onto the k-th copy of C^{m}, then P_{k}^{*} ∈ C^{nm×m} is the inclusion of C^{m} as the k-th summand of the direct sum and

$$\; \Phi (E_{kl}) = P_k \cdot C_\Phi \cdot P_l^* = \sum _{i = 1} ^{nm} P_k v_i ( P_l v_i )^*.$$

Now if the operators V_{i} ∈ C^{m×n} are defined on the k-th standard basis vector e_{k} of C^{n} by

$$\; V_i e_k = P_k v_i,$$

then

$$\Phi (E_{kl}) = \sum _{i = 1} ^{nm} P_k v_i ( P_l v_i )^* = \sum _{i = 1} ^{nm} V_i e_k e_l ^*  V_i ^*
= \sum _{i = 1} ^{nm} V_i E_{kl}  V_i ^*.$$

Extending by linearity gives us

$$\Phi(A) = \sum_{i=1}^{nm} V_i A V_i^*$$

for any A ∈ C^{n×n}. Any map of this form is manifestly completely positive: the map $A \to V_i A V_i^*$ is completely positive, and the sum (across $i$) of completely positive operators is again completely positive. Thus $\Phi$ is completely positive, the desired result.

The above is essentially Choi's original proof. Alternative proofs have also been known.

== Consequences ==
=== Kraus operators ===
In the context of quantum information theory, the operators {V_{i}} are called the Kraus operators (after Karl Kraus) of Φ. Notice, given a completely positive Φ, its Kraus operators need not be unique. For example, any "square root" factorization of the Choi matrix C_{Φ} = B^{∗}B gives a set of Kraus operators.

Let

$$B^* = [b_1, \ldots, b_{nm}],$$

where b_{i}*'s are the row vectors of B, then

$$C_\Phi = \sum _{i = 1} ^{nm} b_i b_i ^*.$$

The corresponding Kraus operators can be obtained by exactly the same argument from the proof.

When the Kraus operators are obtained from the eigenvector decomposition of the Choi matrix, because the eigenvectors form an orthogonal set, the corresponding Kraus operators are also orthogonal in the Hilbert–Schmidt inner product. This is not true in general for Kraus operators obtained from square root factorizations. (Positive semidefinite matrices do not generally have a unique square-root factorizations.)

If two sets of Kraus operators {A_{i}}_{1}^{nm} and {B_{i}}_{1}^{nm} represent the same completely positive map Φ, then there exists a unitary operator matrix

$$\{U_{ij}\}_{ij} \in \mathbb{C}^{nm^2 \times nm^2} \quad \text{such that} \quad A_i = \sum _{j = 1} U_{ij} B_j.$$

This can be viewed as a special case of the result relating two minimal Stinespring representations.

Alternatively, there is an isometry scalar matrix {u_{ij}}_{ij} ∈ C^{nm × nm} such that

$$A_i = \sum _{j = 1} u_{ij} B_j.$$

This follows from the fact that for two square matrices M and N, M M* = N N* if and only if M = N U for some unitary U.

=== Completely copositive maps ===
It follows immediately from Choi's theorem that Φ is completely copositive if and only if it is of the form

$$\Phi(A) = \sum _i V_i A^T V_i ^* .$$

=== Hermitian-preserving maps ===
Choi's technique can be used to obtain a similar result for a more general class of maps. Φ is said to be Hermitian-preserving if A is Hermitian implies Φ(A) is also Hermitian. One can show Φ is Hermitian-preserving if and only if it is of the form

$$\Phi (A) = \sum_{i=1} ^{nm} \lambda_i V_i A V_i ^*$$

where λ_{i} are real numbers, the eigenvalues of C_{Φ}, and each V_{i} corresponds to an eigenvector of C_{Φ}. Unlike the completely positive case, C_{Φ} may fail to be positive. Since Hermitian matrices do not admit factorizations of the form B*B in general, the Kraus representation is no longer possible for a given Φ.

== See also ==
- Stinespring factorization theorem
- Quantum operation
- Holevo's theorem
