= Completely positive map =

C*-algebra mapping preserving positive elements

In mathematics a positive map is a map between C*-algebras that sends positive elements to positive elements. A completely positive map is one that satisfies a stronger, more robust condition.

== Definition ==
Let $A$ and $B$ be C*-algebras. A linear map $\phi: A\to B$ is called a positive map if $\phi$ maps positive elements to positive elements: $a\geq 0 \implies \phi(a)\geq 0$.

Any linear map $\phi:A\to B$ induces another map

$$\textrm{id} \otimes \phi : \mathbb{C}^{k \times k} \otimes A \to \mathbb{C}^{k \times k} \otimes B$$

in a natural way. If $\mathbb{C}^{k\times k}\otimes A$ is identified with the C*-algebra $A^{k\times k}$ of $k\times k$-matrices with entries in $A$, then $\textrm{id}\otimes\phi$ acts as

$$\begin{pmatrix}
a_{11} & \cdots & a_{1k} \\
\vdots & \ddots & \vdots \\
a_{k1} & \cdots & a_{kk}
\end{pmatrix} \mapsto \begin{pmatrix}
\phi(a_{11}) & \cdots & \phi(a_{1k}) \\
\vdots & \ddots & \vdots \\
\phi(a_{k1}) & \cdots & \phi(a_{kk})
\end{pmatrix}.$$

We then say $\phi$ is k-positive if $\textrm{id}_{\mathbb{C}^{k\times k}} \otimes \phi$ is a positive map and completely positive if $\phi$ is k-positive for all k.

== Properties ==
- Positive maps are monotone, i.e. $a_1\leq a_2\implies \phi(a_1)\leq\phi(a_2)$ for all self-adjoint elements $a_1,a_2\in A_{sa}$.
- Since $-\|a\|_A 1_A \leq a \leq \|a\|_A 1_A$ for all self-adjoint elements $a\in A_{sa}$, every positive map is automatically continuous with respect to the C*-norms and its operator norm equals $\|\phi(1_A)\|_B$. A similar statement with approximate units holds for non-unital algebras.
- The set of positive functionals $\to\mathbb{C}$ is the dual cone of the cone of positive elements of $A$.

== Examples ==
- Every *-homomorphism is completely positive.
- For every linear operator $V:H_1\to H_2$ between Hilbert spaces, the map $L(H_1)\to L(H_2), \ A \mapsto V A V^\ast$ is completely positive. Stinespring's theorem says that all completely positive maps are compositions of *-homomorphisms and these special maps.
- Every positive functional $\phi:A \to \mathbb{C}$ (in particular every state) is automatically completely positive.
- Given the algebras $C(X)$ and $C(Y)$ of complex-valued continuous functions on compact Hausdorff spaces $X, Y$, every positive map $C(X)\to C(Y)$ is completely positive.
- The transposition of matrices is a standard example of a positive map that fails to be 2-positive. Let T denote this map on $\mathbb{C}^{n \times n}$. The following is a positive matrix in $\mathbb{C}^{2\times 2} \otimes \mathbb{C}^{2\times 2}$:
  $$\begin{bmatrix}
\begin{pmatrix}1&0\\0&0\end{pmatrix}&
\begin{pmatrix}0&1\\0&0\end{pmatrix}\\
\begin{pmatrix}0&0\\1&0\end{pmatrix}&
\begin{pmatrix}0&0\\0&1\end{pmatrix}
\end{bmatrix}
=
\begin{bmatrix}
1 & 0 & 0 & 1 \\
0 & 0 & 0 & 0 \\
0 & 0 & 0 & 0 \\
1 & 0 & 0 & 1 \\
\end{bmatrix}.$$
  The image of this matrix under $I_2 \otimes T$ is
  $$\begin{bmatrix}
\begin{pmatrix}1&0\\0&0\end{pmatrix}^T&
\begin{pmatrix}0&1\\0&0\end{pmatrix}^T\\
\begin{pmatrix}0&0\\1&0\end{pmatrix}^T&
\begin{pmatrix}0&0\\0&1\end{pmatrix}^T
\end{bmatrix}
=
\begin{bmatrix}
1 & 0 & 0 & 0 \\
0 & 0 & 1 & 0 \\
0 & 1 & 0 & 0 \\
0 & 0 & 0 & 1 \\
\end{bmatrix} ,$$
  which is clearly not positive, having determinant −1. Moreover, the eigenvalues of this matrix are 1,1,1 and −1. (This matrix happens to be the Choi matrix of T, in fact.)
  Incidentally, a map Φ is said to be co-positive if the composition Φ $\circ$ T is positive. The transposition map itself is a co-positive map.

== See also ==
- Choi's theorem on completely positive maps
