= List of things named after Ferdinand Georg Frobenius =

These are things named after Ferdinand Georg Frobenius, a German mathematician.

- Arithmetic and geometric Frobenius
- Cauchy–Frobenius lemma
- Frobenioid
- Frobenius algebra
- Frobenius category
- Frobenius characteristic map
- Frobenius coin problem
  - Frobenius number
- Frobenius companion matrix
- Frobenius covariant
- Frobenius element
- Frobenius endomorphism (also known as Frobenius morphism, Frobenius map)
- Frobenius determinant theorem
- Frobenius formula
- Frobenius group
  - Frobenius complement
  - Frobenius kernel
- Frobenius inner product
  - Frobenius norm
- Frobenius manifold
- Frobenius matrix
- Frobenius method
- Frobenius normal form
- Frobenius polynomial
- Frobenius pseudoprime
- Frobenius reciprocity
- Frobenius solution to the hypergeometric equation
- Frobenius splitting
- Frobenius theorem (differential topology)
- Frobenius theorem (real division algebras)
- Frobenius's theorem (group theory)
  - Frobenius conjecture
- Frobenius–Schur indicator
- Perron–Frobenius theorem
- Quadratic Frobenius test
- Rouché–Frobenius theorem
- Quasi-Frobenius Lie algebra
- Quasi-Frobenius ring
