= List of things named after Emil Artin =

These are things named after Emil Artin, a mathematician.

- Ankeny–Artin–Chowla congruence
- Artin algebra
- Artin billiards
- Artin braid group
- Artin character
- Artin conductor
- Artin's conjecture for conjectures by Artin. These include

- Artin's conjecture on primitive roots
- Artin conjecture on L-functions

- Artin group
- Artin–Hasse exponential
- Artin L-function
- Artin reciprocity
- Artin–Rees lemma
- Artin representation
- Artin–Schreier theorem
- Artin–Schreier theory
- Artin's theorem on induced characters
- Artin–Zorn theorem
- Artinian ideal
- Artinian module
- Artinian ring
- Artin–Tate lemma
- Artin–Tits group
- Fox–Artin arc
- Wedderburn–Artin theorem
- Emil Artin Junior Prize in Mathematics

== See also ==
- Artinian
