= Frobenius theorem =

There are several mathematical theorems named after Ferdinand Georg Frobenius. They include:

- Frobenius theorem (differential topology) in differential geometry and topology for integrable subbundles
- Frobenius theorem (real division algebras) in abstract algebra characterizing the finite-dimensional real division algebras
- Frobenius reciprocity theorem in group representation theory describing the reciprocity relation between restricted and induced representations on a subgroup
- Perron–Frobenius theorem in matrix theory concerning the eigenvalues and eigenvectors of a matrix with positive real coefficients
- Frobenius's theorem (group theory) about the number of solutions of x^{n}=1 in a group
