= Artinian =

Artinian may refer to:

== Mathematics ==
- Objects named for Austrian mathematician Emil Artin (1898–1962)
  - Artinian ideal, an ideal I in R for which the Krull dimension of the quotient ring R/I is 0
  - Artinian ring, a ring which satisfies the descending chain condition on (one-sided) ideals
  - Artinian module, a module which satisfies the descending chain condition on submodules
  - Artinian group, a group which satisfies the descending chain condition on subgroups

== People ==
- Araz Artinian, Armenian-Canadian filmmaker and photographer
- Artine Artinian (1907–2005), French literature scholar

== See also ==
- Descending chain condition
- List of things named after Emil Artin
