= Geometric algebra (disambiguation) =

In mathematics, a geometric algebra is a specific algebraic structure. The term is also used as a blanket term for the theory of geometric algebras.

Geometric algebra may also refer to:

- Algebraic geometry
- Algebraic geometry and analytic geometry
- Analytic geometry
- Éléments de géométrie algébrique, a 1960-7 book by Alexander Grothendieck
- Clifford algebra
- Geometric Algebra (book), a 1957 book by Emil Artin
- Greek geometric algebra
