= O. Timothy O'Meara =

American mathematician

- Born: Onorato Timothy O'Meara; January 29, 1928; Cape Town, South Africa
- Died: June 17, 2018 (aged 90)
- Education: University of Cape Town; Princeton University
- Scientific career
- Fields: Mathematics
- Workplaces: University of Notre Dame
- Doctoral advisor: Emil Artin
- Doctoral students: Everett C. Dade; Alexander J. Hahn

Onorato Timothy O'Meara (January 29, 1928 – June 17, 2018) was an American mathematician known for his work in number theory, linear groups and quadratic forms. He was provost emeritus and professor emeritus of mathematics at the University of Notre Dame.

== Life ==
O'Meara was born in South Africa and graduated from University of Cape Town in 1947. He continued there for a master's degree, then transferring to Princeton University where he obtained the Ph.D. in mathematics in 1953. He then taught at University of Otago in New Zealand for three years. Subsequently, he returned to New Jersey and was in the Institute for Advanced Study. He joined University of Notre Dame in 1962 and became Provost. He is known for his books Symplectic Groups, Introduction to Quadratic Forms, and The Classical Groups and K-Theory (co-author, Alexander J. Hahn).

In 2008, the University of Notre Dame Mathematics Library was rededicated and named in O'Meara's honor.

O'Meara died on June 17, 2018, aged 90.

== Works ==
=== Selected articles ===
- O'Meara, O. T. (1956). "Witt's theorem and the isometry of lattices". Proc. Amer. Math. Soc. 7 (1): 9–22. doi:10.2307/2033236. JSTOR 2033236.
- O'Meara, O. T. (1956). "Basis structure of modules". Proc. Amer. Math. Soc. 7 (6): 965–974. doi:10.2307/2033023. JSTOR 2033023.
- O'Meara, O. T. (1957). "Integral equivalence of quadratic forms in ramified local fields". American Journal of Mathematics. 79 (1): 157–186. doi:10.2307/2372391. JSTOR 2372391.
- O'Meara, O. T. (1959). "Infinite dimensional quadratic forms over algebraic number fields". Proc. Amer. Math. Soc. 10 (1): 55–58. doi:10.2307/2032887. JSTOR 2032887.
- "On the finite generation of linear groups over Hasse domains". J. Reine Angew. Math. 217 (79): 79–108. 1965. doi:10.1515/crll.1965.217.79.
- with Barth Pollak: O'Meara, O. T.; Pollak, Barth (1965). "Generation of local integral orthogonal groups". Mathematische Zeitschrift. 87 (3): 385–400. doi:10.1007/BF01111720.
- O'Meara, O. T. (1968). "The automorphisms of the orthogonal groups Ω_{n}(V) over fields". American Journal of Mathematics. 90 (4): 1260–1306. doi:10.2307/2373300. JSTOR 2373300.
- O'Meara, O. T. (1969). "Group-theoretic characterization of transvections using CDC". Mathematische Zeitschrift. 110 (5): 385–394. doi:10.1007/BF01110686.
- "The automorphisms of the orthogonal groups and their congruence subgroups over arithmetic domains". J. Reine Angew. Math. 1969 (238): 169–206. 1969. doi:10.1515/crll.1969.238.169.
- "The construction of indecomposable positive definite quadratic forms". J. Reine Angew. Math. 276 (99): 99–123. 1975. doi:10.1515/crll.1975.276.99.
- "A general isomorphism for linear groups". Journal of Algebra. 44 (1): 93–142. January 1977. doi:10.1016/0021-8693(77)90167-3.
- "The Idea of a Catholic University: A Personal Perspective". Marquette Law Review. Winter 1995: Symposium on Religiously Affiliated Law Schools. 78 (2): 389–396.

=== Books ===
- 1963, 2000: Introduction to Quadratic Forms, Classics in Mathematics Springer, ISBN 3540665641
- 1974: Lectures on Linear Groups, American Mathematical Society, ISBN 0-8218-1672-1
- 1978: Symplectic Groups American Mathematical Society, ISBN 0821815164
- 1989: (with Alexander Hahn) The Classical Groups and K-Theory Springer, ISBN 3642057373

== See also ==
- Symplectic group
- Classical groups
- K-theory
