= Frobenius determinant theorem =

In mathematics, the Frobenius determinant theorem states that if one takes the multiplication table of a finite group G and replaces each entry g with a variable x_{g}, and subsequently takes the determinant, then the resulting multivariable polynomial factors as a product of n irreducible polynomials, where n is the number of conjugacy classes of G. Moreover, in the factorization, each of these irreducibles appears raised to a power equal to its degree.

This was first stated as a conjecture in a letter of 1896 by the mathematician Richard Dedekind to F. G. Frobenius, who proved it by methods which began a new branch of mathematics, the representation theory of finite groups. See (Dedekind 1968), with English translation (Curtis 2003, p. 51).

== Formal statement ==
Let a finite group $G$ have elements $g_1, g_2,\dots,g_n$, and let $x_{g_i}$ be associated with each element of $G$. Define the matrix $X_G$ with entries $a_{ij}=x_{g_i g_j}$. Then:

$$\det X_G = \prod_{j=1}^r P_j(x_{g_1},x_{g_2},\dots,x_{g_n})^{\deg P_j}$$

where the $P_{j}$'s are pairwise non-proportional irreducible polynomials and $r$ is the number of conjugacy classes of G.

== Examples ==
If $G=\Z/2\Z=\{e,g\}$ with $g^2=e$ with n = 2 conjugacy classes, the matrix would be:

$$X_G = \begin{bmatrix} x_{e} & x_g \\ x_g & x_{e} \end{bmatrix}.$$

The determinant of this matrix has n = 2 irreducible factors of degree 1, each with multiplicity 1:

$$\det X_G = (x_e - x_g)(x_e + x_g).$$

If $G=S_3$, the symmetric group of order 3, the matrix would be:

$$X_G = \begin{bmatrix}
x_{e} & x_{(12)} & x_{(23)} & x_{(31)} & x_{(123)} & x_{(321)}\\
x_{(12)} & x_{e} & x_{(321)} & x_{(123)} & x_{(31)} & x_{(23)}\\
x_{(23)} & x_{(123)} & x_{e} & x_{(321)} & x_{(12)} & x_{(31)}\\
x_{(31)} &  x_{(321)} & x_{(123)} & x_{e} & x_{(23)} & x_{(12)}\\
x_{(123)} & x_{(23)} & x_{(31)} & x_{(12)} & x_{(321)} & x_{e}\\
x_{(321)} & x_{(31)} & x_{(12)} & x_{(23)} & x_{e} & x_{(123)}
\end{bmatrix}.$$

The determinant of this matrix factors out as:

$$\textstyle \det X_G = \left(\sum_{\sigma\in S_3}x_\sigma\right)
\left(\sum_{\sigma\in S_3}\text{sign}(\sigma)x_\sigma\right)
\left(F(x_{e},x_{(123)},x_{(321)})-F(x_{(12)},x_{(23)},x_{(31)})\right)^2$$

where $F(a,b,c)=a^2+b^2+c^2-ab-bc-ca$. The number of irreducible polynomial factors is three, which is equal to the number of conjugacy classes of $S_3$. The degree-2 polynomial factor has multiplicity 2.

== Proof ==
This proof is based on the one given by Evan Chen, which involves representation theory. It relies on the following lemma:

Lemma—Let $Y$ be an $n\times n$ matrix whose entries are independent variables $y_{ij}$. Then $\det Y$ is an irreducible polynomial.

Let $V=(V,\rho)=\C[G]$ be the regular representation of group $G$. Consider the linear map:

$$T=\sum_{g\in G}x_g\rho(g)$$,

whose matrix is given by $X_G$. We wish to examine $\det T$.

By Maschke's theorem, $\C[G]$ is a semisimple algebra, so it is possible to break down $V$ into a direct sum of irreducible representations,

$$V=\bigoplus_{i=1}^rV_i^{\oplus\dim V_i}$$

where each $V_i$ is an irreducible representation of $V$. This lets us write:

$$\det T=\prod_{i=1}^r\left(\det(T|_{V_i})\right)^{\dim V_i},$$

where each $\det(T|_{V_i})$ is a polynomial factor of $\det T$.

A result from character theory states that the number of nonisomorphic irreps of regular representation $V$ equals the number of conjugacy classes of $G$. This explains why the number of polynomial factors is equal to the number of conjugacy classes.

Furthermore, $\dim V_i$ is both the degree and multiplicity of the polynomial $\det(T|_{V_i})$, which explains why the degree and multiplicity of each polynomial factor are equal.

To complete the proof, we wish to show that polynomials $\det(T|_{V_i})$ are irreducible and not proportional to each other.

Proof of irreducibility: By Jacobson density theorem, for any matrix $M\in\text{Mat}(V_i)$, there exists a particular choice of complex numbers for each $x_g\in G$ such that:

$$M=\sum_{g\in G}x_g\rho_i(g)=T|_{V_i}(\{x_g\})$$

This shows that $T|_{V_i}$, when viewed as a matrix with polynomial entries, must have linearly independent entries. Thus, by letting each of these entries be an independent variable $y_{ij}$, it follows by Lemma above that $\det T|_{V_i}$ is an irreducible polynomial.

Proof of non-proportionality: This follows by noticing that we can read off the character $\chi_{V_i}$ from the coefficients of $\det T|_{V_i}$, using the fact that for all $g\in G$, the coefficient of $x_gx_{1_G}^{k-1}$ in $\det T|_{V_i}$ is equal to $\chi_{V_i}(g)$. Since characters are linearly independent to each other, it follows that $\det T|_{V_i}$ is not proportional to any other polynomial factor.
