= Mark Brunswick =

American composer

Mark Brunswick ( January 6, 1902 – May 25/26, 1971) was an American composer of the twentieth century. He had only recently completed the second act of an opera based on Ibsen's The Master Builder when he died suddenly in London in May 1971, at the start of what was to have been an extended tour of Europe with his wife, Natascha Artin Brunswick. Brunswick had been at work on the opera for several years, and Act I had not long before received a concert performance as a work in progress at the City College of New York.

== Biography ==
Born in New York City, Brunswick was the third of four children of secular Jewish parents. His father, of an Alsatian family background, was a successful manufacturer in the garment industry. His mother was an educated German-born woman, trained as an opera singer, who encouraged Mark's artistic interests and his pursuit of an education that diverged from the conventional.

He attended the Horace Mann School in New York, and later Phillips Exeter Academy in New Hampshire. Though he took some courses in the extension division of Columbia University, he never formally acquired a college degree. Having by the age of 15 decided on a career of musical composition and theory, he sought out private musical study: piano with Victor Wittgenstein; harmony, counterpoint and fugue with Rubin Goldmark (himself a student of Dvořák); and composition with Ernest Bloch in Cleveland (where he met fellow student Roger Sessions, with whom he maintained a lifelong friendship) and Nadia Boulanger in Paris.

In 1924, Brunswick moved to Vienna. There he fell in love with Ruth Mack, a student, analysand (since 1922), and collaborative colleague of Sigmund Freud's, and married at the time to Dr. Herman Blumgart, a cousin of Mark's. As a teenager, Brunswick had actually been a guest at their wedding years earlier in 1917. Their marriage was by now in serious trouble, however, and in 1928, Mark and Ruth were married in Vienna. Freud served as their witness – one of the few weddings he ever attended.

The couple returned briefly to the U.S. so that their daughter, Matilda (Til) could be born there, then returned soon after the birth to Vienna. Though it would later in Freudian analytic circles certainly be regarded as improper, Mark, Ruth and their daughter Til were close friends of the Freuds, and socialized with them regularly. Brunswick's home movies of Freud now reside in the archive of the Freud Museum in London. During his years in Vienna – inspired no doubt by Freud's own collection – Brunswick began acquiring the antiquities and rare old books that so characterized his various residences.

Probably his primary musical association in Vienna was with Anton Webern. Whether he was formally a student of Webern's is unclear. A letter written to Brunswick in New York, dated June 23, 1938, addresses him as "guter, alter Freund," and "lieber Freund," and, after giving news of performances of some Webern works, goes on to ask, "Was machen jetzt die schönen Rosen in der Hasenauerstrasse? Verlassen? War es doch gerade vor einem Jahre, dass wir uns dort bei unerhört prächtigem Weine - sagen wir: besauften!!! Ich hoffe, es kommt wieder!" He signs the letter, "Ihr alter Webern." What is clear from this letter is that the two were on close terms during at least part of Brunswick's Vienna period. What other musical friendships and contacts he had there are so far unknown, although it is hard to imagine they would have been insignificant.

In 1937, Mark and Ruth were divorced in Vienna, but – against Freud's advice – remarried six months later. Late that year, Mark returned alone to New York. Ruth, Til, Mark's mother and the family dog followed his return the following year in March 1938.

In fall 1938, with fascism ominously ascendant in Germany and Austria, Brunswick became Chairman of the Placement Committee for German and Austrian Musicians, which in mid 1939 was integrated into the newly formed National Refugee Service under the name National Committee for Refugee Musicians. As chair Brunswick was pivotal in finding placement into musical and academic positions in the U.S. for hundreds of European colleagues fleeing Hitler. In this capacity he had a fairly regular correspondence with Arnold Schoenberg, who was now living in Southern California. No mention is made in those extant letters of any previous contact, and of course Schoenberg had moved to Berlin in 1924, the year Brunswick arrived in Vienna.

Before his appointment as Chairman of the Music Department at the City College of New York in 1946, Brunswick headed the music theory and composition department at the Greenwich House Settlement Music School (1938–43). He also taught at Black Mountain College in North Carolina (summer of 1944), the Music Institute of Kenyon College (summer of 1945), and Brooklyn College (1945–46). In addition to his teaching, Brunswick – together with Roger Sessions and Eduard Steuermann – was active in organizing concerts of modern music under the rubric "Contemporary Concerts." From 1941 to 1950 he was President of the American Section of the International Society for Contemporary Music.

Mark and Ruth divorced permanently in 1945, and Mark was married for several years to a former student at Black Mountain, Arlyn McKenna. In 1959 he married Natascha Artin, with whom he lived happily for the remainder of his life. He moved from his apartment in Manhattan to Natascha's house in Princeton, New Jersey, where he resumed his long and intimate friendship with Roger Sessions, then on the faculty at Princeton. Mark and Natascha spent each summer in the log cabin Mark had purchased on Franklin Falls Pond (a section of the Saranac River) in New York's Adirondack Mountains.

During his tenure as Chairman at CCNY (he retired in 1965), Brunswick was a fierce and active defender of academic freedom amid the McCarthy hysteria of the early 1950s. In April 1954, on the occasion of "Academic Freedom Week" at City College, Brunswick was presented an award to "the faculty member who has done the most to promote and safeguard academic freedom." Interviewed for the campus newspaper, Brunswick commented self-effacingly, "I'm truly thrilled. But I haven't really done that much. All I've ever done is spoken my mind at every appropriate place." Brunswick also worked actively in the 1952 presidential campaign of Adlai Stevenson.

An unsolicited letter of appreciation from a Smith College student who had been a visitor to one of his classes epitomizes Brunswick's informal and sensitive teaching style: "You created an atmosphere that I'm quite unused to here at Smith, in which the professor is interested in the students' ideas and feelings, rather than merely a coherent arrangement of cold, objective facts . . . It's easy to see that yours is a true give and take relationship with your students as people." Brunswick himself once commented on teaching, "In it I can lose myself, and at the same time be refreshed by contact with students and their works in my own creative work and in my whole relation to music."

Mark Brunswick was not a prolific composer; in fact he found composition difficult, and even complained of being blocked creatively. "In this musical world of today, with its conflicting and uncertain tendencies and influences, the achieving and maintaining of true individuality and purity of musical thought will always require an intensity of effort and of imagination that can never be easy," he said.

== Selected works ==
Orchestral

- Symphony in B♭ (1948)
- Air with Toccata for string orchestra (1967)
- Nocturne and Rondo for orchestra

Chamber music

- 2 Movements, Op. 1 for string quartet (1925–26)
- Fantasia for viola solo (1933)
- Seven Trios for string quartet (1955)
- Septet in Seven Movements for flute, oboe, clarinet, bassoon, horn, viola and cello (1957)
- Quartet for violin, viola, cello and double bass (1960)

Piano

- Six Bagatelles for solo piano (1958)

Organ

- Das alte Jahr vergangen ist, Chorale Prelude for organ (1933)

Vocal

- Fragment of Sappho, Motet for mixed chorus a cappella (1937)
- Four Songs for tenor and piano (1964)
