= Artin–Hasse exponential =

In mathematics, specifically in p-adic analysis, the Artin–Hasse exponential, introduced by Emil Artin and Helmut Hasse in 1928, is the power series given by

$$E_p(x) = \exp\left(x + \frac{x^p}{p} + \frac{x^{p^2}}{p^2} + \frac{x^{p^3}}{p^3} +\cdots\right).$$

== Motivation ==
One motivation for considering this series to be analogous to the exponential function comes from infinite products. In the ring of formal power series $\Q[[x]]$ we have the identity

$$e^x = \prod_{n \geq 1}(1-x^n)^{-\mu(n)/n},$$

where $\mu$ is the Möbius function. This identity can be verified by showing that the logarithmic derivatives of both sides are equal and that both sides have the same constant term. Similarly, one can verify a product expansion for the Artin–Hasse exponential:

$$E_p(x) = \prod_{(p,n)=1}(1-x^n)^{-\mu(n)/n}.$$

So passing from a product over all $n$ to a product over only $n$ coprime to $p$, which is a typical operation in $p$-adic analysis, leads from $e^x$ to $E_p(x)$.

== Properties ==
The coefficients of $E_p(x)$ are rational. We can use either formula for $E_p(x)$ to prove that, unlike $e^x$, all of its coefficients are $p$-integral; in other words, the denominators of the coefficients of $E_p(x)$ are not divisible by $p$.

A first proof uses the definition of $E_p(x)$ and Dwork's lemma, which says that a power series $f(x)$ with rational coefficients has $p$-integral coefficients if and only if

$$\frac{f(x^p)}{f(x)^p}\equiv 1\mod p\Z_p[[x]].$$

When $f(x)=E_p(x)$, we have

$$\frac{f(x^p)}{f(x)^p} = e^{-px},$$

where the constant term is 1 and all higher coefficients are in $p\Z_p$.

A second proof comes from the infinite product for $E_p(x)$: each exponent $-\mu(n)/n$ for $n$ not divisible by $p$ is a $p$-integral, and when a rational number $a$ is $p$-integral, all coefficients in the binomial expansion of $(1-x^n)^a$ are $p$-integral by $p$-adic continuity of the binomial coefficient polynomials

$$\frac{t!}{k!(t-k)!}$$

in $t$ together with their obvious integrality when $t$ is a nonnegative integer ($a$ is a $p$-adic limit of nonnegative integers). Thus, each factor in the product of $E_p(x)$ has $p$-integral coefficients, so $E_p(x)$ itself has $p$-integral coefficients.

The $p$-integral series expansion has radius of convergence 1.

== Combinatorial interpretation ==
The Artin–Hasse exponential is the generating function for the probability that a uniformly randomly selected element of the symmetric group $S_n$ has $p$-power order (the number of which is denoted by $t_{p,n}$):

$$E_p(x)=\sum_{n\ge 0} \frac{t_{p,n}}{n!}x^n.$$

This gives a third proof that the coefficients of $E_p(x)$ are $p$-integral, using the theorem of Frobenius that in a finite group of order divisible by $d$ the number of elements of order dividing $d$ is also divisible by $d$. Apply this theorem to the $n$th symmetric group with $d$ equal to the highest power of $p$ dividing $n!$.

More generally, for any topologically finitely generated profinite group $G$ there is an identity

$$\exp\bigg(\sum_{H \subset G} x^{[G:H]}/[G:H]\bigg)=\sum_{n\ge 0} \frac{a_{G,n}}{n!}x^n,$$

where $H$ runs over open subgroups of $G$ of finite index (there are finitely many of each index since $G$ is topologically finitely generated) and $a_{G,n}$ is the number of continuous homomorphisms from $G$ to $S_n$.

Two special cases are worth noting. Firstly, if $G$ is the $p$-adic integers, it has exactly one open subgroup of each $p$-power index and a continuous homomorphism from $G$ to $S_n$ is essentially the same thing as choosing an element of $p$-power order in $S_n$, so we have recovered the above combinatorial interpretation of the Taylor coefficients in the Artin–Hasse exponential series.

Secondly, if $G$ is a finite group, then the sum in the exponential is a finite sum running over all subgroups of $G$, and continuous homomorphisms from $G$ to $S_n$ are simply homomorphisms from $G$ to $S_n$. The result in this case is due to Wohlfahrt.

The special case when $G$ is a finite cyclic group is due to Chowla, Herstein, and Scott (1952), and takes the form

$$\exp\bigg(\sum_{d|m} x^d/d\bigg)=\sum_{n\ge 0} \frac{a_{m,n}}{n!}x^n,$$

where $a_{m,n}$ is the number of solutions to $g^m=1$ in S_{n}.

David Roberts provided a natural combinatorial link between the Artin–Hasse exponential and the regular exponential in the spirit of the ergodic perspective (linking the $p$-adic and regular norms over the rationals) by showing that the Artin–Hasse exponential is also the generating function for the probability that an element of the symmetric group is unipotent in characteristic $p$, whereas the regular exponential is the probability that an element of the same group is unipotent in characteristic zero.

== Conjectures ==
At the 2002 PROMYS program, Keith Conrad conjectured that the coefficients of $E_p(x)$ are uniformly distributed in the p-adic integers with respect to the normalized Haar measure, with supporting computational evidence. The problem is still open.

Dinesh Thakur has also posed the problem of whether the Artin–Hasse exponential reduced mod $p$ is transcendental over $\mathbb{F}_p(x)$. This was recently resolved by Joe Kramer-Miller.

== See also ==
- p-adic exponential function
- Witt vector
- Formal group
