= Frobenius characteristic map =

Mathematical concept

In mathematics, especially representation theory and combinatorics, a Frobenius characteristic map is an isometric isomorphism between the ring of characters of symmetric groups and the ring of symmetric functions. It builds a bridge between representation theory of the symmetric groups and algebraic combinatorics. This map makes it possible to study representation problems with help of symmetric functions and vice versa. This map is named after German mathematician Ferdinand Georg Frobenius.

== Definition ==
=== The ring of characters ===
Let $R^n$ be the $\mathbb{Z}$-module generated by all irreducible characters of $S_n$ over $\mathbb{C}$. In particular $S_0=\{1\}$ and therefore $R^0=\mathbb{Z}$. The ring of characters is defined to be the direct sum
$$R=\bigoplus_{n=0}^{\infty}R^n$$
with the following multiplication to make $R$ a graded commutative ring. Given $f \in R^n$ and $g \in R^m$, the product is defined to be
$$f \cdot g = \operatorname{ind}_{S_m \times S_n}^{S_{m+n}}(f \times g)$$
with the understanding that $S_m \times S_n$ is embedded into $S_{m+n}$ and $\operatorname{ind}$ denotes the induced character.

=== Frobenius characteristic map ===
For $f \in R^n$, the value of the Frobenius characteristic map $\operatorname{ch}$ at $f$, which is also called the Frobenius image of $f$, is defined to be the polynomial

$$\operatorname{ch}(f)=\frac{1}{n!}\sum_{w \in S_n}f(w)p_{\rho(w)}=\sum_{\mu \vdash n}z_\mu^{-1}f(\mu)p_\mu.$$

=== Remarks ===
Here, $\rho(w)$ is the integer partition determined by $w$. For example, when $n=3$ and $w=(12)(3)$, $\rho(w)=(2,1)$ corresponds to the partition $3=2+1$. Conversely, a partition $\mu$ of $n$ (written as $\mu \vdash n$) determines a conjugacy class $K_\mu$ in $S_n$. For example, given $\mu=(2,1)\vdash 3$, $K_\mu=\{(12)(3),(13)(2),(23)(1)\}$ is a conjugacy class. Hence by abuse of notation $f(\mu)$ can be used to denote the value of $f$ on the conjugacy class determined by $\mu$. Note this always makes sense because $f$ is a class function.

Let $\mu$ be a partition of $n$, then $p_\mu$ is the product of power sum symmetric polynomials determined by $\mu$ of $n$ variables. For example, given $\mu=(3,2)$, a partition of $5$,

$$\begin{aligned}
p_\mu(x_1,x_2,x_3,x_4,x_5)&=p_3(x_1,x_2,x_3,x_4,x_5)p_2(x_1,x_2,x_3,x_4,x_5) \\
&=(x_1^3+x_2^3+x_3^3+x_4^3+x_5^3)(x_1^2+x_2^2+x_3^2+x_4^2+x_5^2)
\end{aligned}$$

Finally, $z_\lambda$ is defined to be $\frac{n!}{k_\lambda}$, where $k_\lambda$ is the cardinality of the conjugacy class $K_\lambda$. For example, when $\lambda = (2,1)\vdash 3$, $z_\lambda = \frac{3!}{3}=2$. The second definition of $\operatorname{ch}(f)$ can therefore be justified directly:
$$\frac{1}{n!}\sum_{w \in S_n}f(w)p_{\rho(w)} = \sum_{\mu \vdash n}\frac{k_\mu}{n!}f(\mu)p_\mu
= \sum_{\mu \vdash n}z_\mu^{-1}f(\mu)p_\mu$$

== Properties ==
=== Inner product and isometry ===
==== Hall inner product ====
The inner product on the ring of symmetric functions is the Hall inner product. It is required that $\langle h_\mu,m_\lambda \rangle = \delta_{\mu\lambda}$ . Here, $m_\lambda$ is a monomial symmetric function and $h_\mu$ is a product of completely homogeneous symmetric functions. To be precise, let $\mu=(\mu_1,\mu_2,\cdots)$ be a partition of integer, then
$$h_\mu=h_{\mu_1}h_{\mu_2}\cdots.$$
In particular, with respect to this inner product, $\{p_\lambda\}$ form a orthogonal basis: $\langle p_\lambda,p_\mu \rangle = \delta_{\lambda\mu}z_\lambda$, and the Schur polynomials $\{s_\lambda\}$ form a orthonormal basis: $\langle s_\lambda,s_\mu \rangle = \delta_{\lambda\mu}$, where $\delta_{\lambda\mu}$ is the Kronecker delta.

==== Inner product of characters ====
Let $f,g \in R^n$, their inner product is defined to be

$$\langle f, g \rangle_n = \frac{1}{n!}\sum_{w \in S_n}f(w)g(w) = \sum_{\mu \vdash n}z_\mu^{-1}f(\mu)g(\mu)$$
If $f = \sum_{n}f_n,g = \sum_{n}g_n$, then

$$\langle f,g \rangle = \sum_n \langle f_n, g_n \rangle_n$$

==== Frobenius characteristic map as an isometry ====
One can prove that the Frobenius characteristic map is an isometry by explicit computation. To show this, it suffices to assume that $f,g \in R^n$:
$$\begin{aligned}
\langle \operatorname{ch}(f),\operatorname{ch}(g) \rangle &=
\left\langle \sum_{\mu\vdash n}z_\mu^{-1}f(\mu)p_\mu,
\sum_{\lambda\vdash n}z_\lambda^{-1}g(\lambda)p_\lambda\right\rangle \\
&= \sum_{\mu,\lambda\vdash n}z_\mu^{-1}z_\lambda^{-1}
f(\mu)g(\mu)\langle p_\mu,p_\lambda \rangle \\
&= \sum_{\mu,\lambda\vdash n}z_\mu^{-1}z_\lambda^{-1}
f(\mu)g(\mu)z_\mu\delta_{\mu\lambda} \\
&= \sum_{\mu\vdash n}z_{\mu}^{-1}f(\mu)g(\mu) \\
&= \langle f,g \rangle
\end{aligned}$$

=== Ring isomorphism ===
The map $\operatorname{ch}$ is an isomorphism between $R$ and the $\mathbb{Z}$-ring $\Lambda$. The fact that this map is a ring homomorphism can be shown by Frobenius reciprocity. For $f \in R^n$ and $g \in R^m$,
$$\begin{aligned}
\operatorname{ch}(f \cdot g) &= \langle \operatorname{ind}_{S_n \times S_m}^{S_{m+n}}(f \times g),\psi \rangle_{m+n} \\
&= \langle f \times g, \operatorname{res}_{S_n \times S_m}^{S_{m+n}}\psi \rangle \\
&= \frac{1}{n!m!}\sum_{\pi\sigma \in S_n \times S_m}(f \times g)(\pi\sigma)p_{\rho(\pi\sigma)} \\
&= \frac{1}{n!m!}\sum_{\pi \in S_n , \sigma \in S_m} f(\pi)g(\sigma)p_{\rho(\pi)} p_{\rho(\sigma)} \\
&= \left[\frac{1}{n!}\sum_{\pi \in S_n}f(\pi)p_{\rho(\pi)} \right]\left[\frac{1}{m!}\sum_{\sigma \in S_m}g(\sigma)p_{\rho(\sigma)} \right] \\
&= \operatorname{ch}(f)\operatorname{ch}(g)
\end{aligned}$$

Defining $\psi:S_n \to \Lambda^n$ by $\psi(w) = p_{\rho(w)}$, the Frobenius characteristic map can be written in a shorter form:

$$\operatorname{ch}(f)=\langle f, \psi \rangle_n, \quad f \in R^n.$$

In particular, if $f$ is an irreducible representation, then $\operatorname{ch}(f)$ is a Schur polynomial of $n$ variables. It follows that $\operatorname{ch}$ maps an orthonormal basis of $R$ to an orthonormal basis of $\Lambda$. Therefore it is an isomorphism.

== Example ==
=== Computing the Frobenius image ===
Let $f$ be the alternating representation of $S_3$, which is defined by $f(\sigma)v=\sgn(\sigma)v$, where $\sgn(\sigma)$ is the sign of the permutation $\sigma$. There are three conjugacy classes of $S_3$, which can be represented by $e$ (identity or the product of three 1-cycles), $(12)$(transpositions or the products of one 2-cycle and one 1-cycle) and $(123)$ (3-cycles). These three conjugacy classes therefore correspond to three partitions of $3$ given by $(1,1,1)$, $(2,1)$, $(3)$. The values of $f$ on these three classes are $1,-1,1$ respectively. Therefore:
$$\begin{aligned}
\operatorname{ch}(f) &= z_{(1,1,1)}^{-1}f((1,1,1))p_{(1,1,1)}+z_{(2,1)}f((2,1))p_{(2,1)}+z_{(3)}^{-1}f((3))p_{(3)} \\
&= \frac{1}{6}(x_1+x_2+x_3)^3 - \frac{1}{2}(x_1^2+x_2^2+x_3^2)(x_1+x_2+x_3)+\frac{1}{3}(x_1^3+x_2^3+x_3^3 ) \\
&= x_1x_2x_3
\end{aligned}$$
Since $f$ is an irreducible representation (which can be shown by computing its characters), the computation above gives the Schur polynomial of three variables corresponding to the partition $3=1+1+1$.
