= Natascha Artin Brunswick =

American-Russian mathematician and photographer (1909–2003)

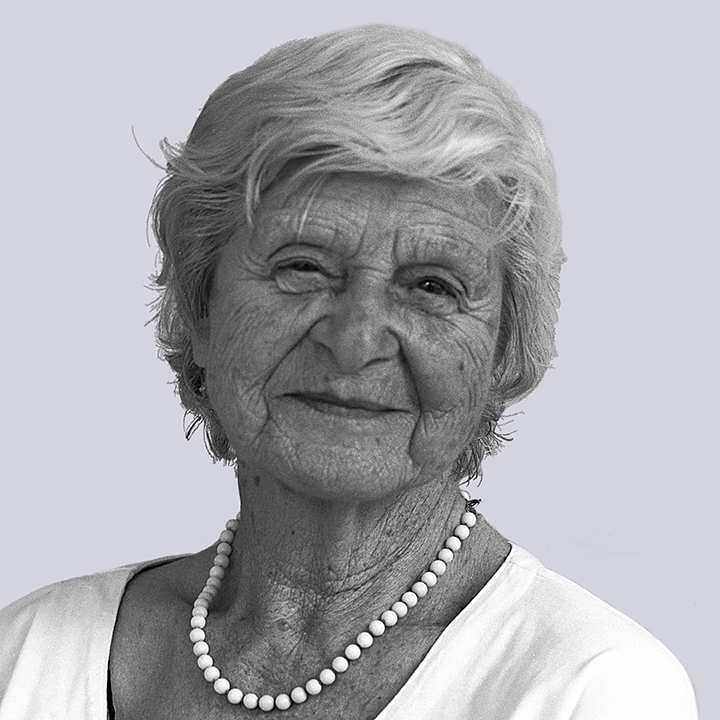
- Natascha Artin Brunswick in 2000
- Born: Natalya Naumovna Yasnaya; June 11, 1909; Saint Petersburg, Russian Empire
- Died: February 3, 2003 (aged 93); Princeton, New Jersey, US
- Education: University of Hamburg
- Spouses: Emil Artin, Mark Brunswick

Natascha Artin Brunswick (née Natalya Naumovna Yasnaya (Note: Russian: Наталья Наумовна Ясная); June 11, 1909 – February 3, 2003) was a Russian-American mathematician and photographer.

== St. Petersburg and Hamburg ==
Natascha Artin Brunswick was the daughter of Naum Jasny, a Russian Jewish economist from Kharkiv. Her mother was a Russian Orthodox aristocrat and dentist. Since at the time Russian Orthodox Christians were prohibited from marrying Jews, she converted to Protestantism. They were married in Finland.

Her father Naum Jasny was an adherent of the Mensheviks and fled to Tbilisi after the October Revolution in 1917. Natascha, her sister, and her mother followed in 1920. After the Bolsheviks took control of Georgia, the family lived in Austria from 1922 to 1924, for a brief period in 1924 in Berlin, and finally moved to Langenhorn, Hamburg, where they remained until 1937. Natascha Jasny attended the progressive Lichtwark school. While still in school, she photographed with a simple box camera and processed her own pictures in the bathroom at home, which served as a makeshift darkroom.

Natascha graduated in 1928. She hoped to study architecture at the Bauhaus Dessau, but the family's financial situation made this impossible. She instead studied mathematics at the University of Hamburg, where she also took courses in art history from Aby Warburg and Erwin Panofsky. She graduated from the university in 1930 with a Magister degree.

On August 29, 1929 she married her mathematics professor Emil Artin, who had been teaching in Hamburg since 1923. In 1933, the Artins had a daughter, Karin, and in 1934 a son, Michael.

Because his wife was of Jewish descent, Emil Artin was forced into early retirement from his teaching position under the Nazi Party Law for the Restoration of the Professional Civil Service. On September 27, 1934, Artin already had to sign a declaration that his wife was not "Aryan". The Artin family managed to leave Germany for the United States on October 21, 1937. Since they were prohibited from taking larger sums of money with them, the Artins shipped their entire household, which reflected their modernist sensibilities.

== Life in the United States ==
Natascha's husband first obtained a teaching position at the University of Notre Dame, and in 1938 moved to Indiana University in Bloomington, Indiana. The Artins had their third child, son Thomas (Tom), in 1938. During World War II, Natascha Artin was classified an enemy alien. The United States Army nevertheless hired her in 1942 to teach Russian to soldiers under Army Specialized Training Program at Indiana University.

In 1946, Emil was hired by Princeton University, and the Artins moved to Princeton, New Jersey. They divorced in 1958, after which Emil Artin returned to Hamburg. Natasha Artin remarried in 1960. Her second husband was composer Mark Brunswick.

She lived in Princeton until her death in 2003.

== Work as a mathematics editor ==
After her move to Princeton, Natascha Artin joined the group around Richard Courant at the mathematics department of New York University. She became the technical editor of the journal Communications on Pure and Applied Mathematics, founded at the Courant Institute of Mathematical Sciences in 1948, and in 1956 became the primary translation editor for the journal Theory of Probability and Its Applications, a position she held until 1989. In recognition of her long-standing membership of over 50 years, she was made an Honorary Member of the American Mathematical Society.

== Work as photographer ==
Artin Brunswick never saw herself as a professional photographer. She considered it a "private passion, nevertheless, it was a bit more than just taking snapshots."

After they married in 1929, Emil Artin, who shared her passion for photography, presented her as a gift a precious Leica compact camera. She was encouraged in her photography by the painter Heinrich Stegemann, a family friend. She first took pictures of family members, friends, and landscapes, but later explored Hamburg and photographed scenes such as the Port of Hamburg, the Jungfernstieg, and the main railway station. She was particularly interested in architecture, and, influenced by the ideas of the Bauhaus, preferred clear, bright lines in her photographs.

As she was classified an enemy alien during World War II, her camera was provisionally confiscated by police in 1942. By the time it was returned to her, she had lost her passion for photography. Her prints from the time in Hamburg, however, survived through her emigration. Her son Tom rediscovered them about forty years later in a cabinet. He recognized their importance and contacted galleries in Hamburg. Artin Brunswick's photographs were first shown at the Kunstgenuss gallery in Hamburg-Eppendorf in 1999. In 2001, the Museum für Kunst und Gewerbe organized an exhibition of 227 original prints under the title Hamburg, As I Saw It. Photographs from the 1920s and 30s. Despite her advanced age of 91 years, Natascha Brunswick took the trip from New York to attend the opening. The museum now holds 230 original prints; the negatives are in the possession of the Artin family.
