= Artinian ideal =

In abstract algebra, an Artinian ideal, named after Emil Artin, is encountered in ring theory, in particular, with polynomial rings.

Given a polynomial ring R = k[X_{1}, ... X_{n}] where k is some field, an Artinian ideal is an ideal I in R for which the Krull dimension of the quotient ring R/I is 0. Also, less precisely, one can think of an Artinian ideal as one that has at least each indeterminate in R raised to a power greater than 0 as a generator.

If an ideal is not Artinian, one can take the Artinian closure of it as follows. First, take the least common multiple of the generators of the ideal. Second, add to the generating set of the ideal each indeterminate of the LCM with its power increased by 1 if the power is not 0 to begin with. An example is below.

== Examples ==
Let $R = k[x,y,z]$, and let $I = (x^2,y^5,z^4), \; J = (x^3, y^2, z^6, x^2yz^4, yz^3)$ and $\displaystyle{K = (x^3, y^4, x^2z^7)}$. Here, $\displaystyle{I}$ and $\displaystyle{J}$ are Artinian ideals, but $\displaystyle{K}$ is not because in $\displaystyle{K}$, the indeterminate $\displaystyle{z}$ does not appear alone to a power as a generator.

To take the Artinian closure of $\displaystyle{K}$, $\displaystyle{\hat{K}}$, we find the LCM of the generators of $\displaystyle{K}$, which is $\displaystyle{x^3y^4z^7}$. Then, we add the generators $\displaystyle{x^4, y^5}$, and $\displaystyle{z^8}$ to $\displaystyle{K}$, and reduce. Thus, we have $\displaystyle{\hat{K}} = (x^3, y^4, z^8, x^2z^7)$ which is Artinian.
