= Geometric Algebra (book) =

1957 book by Emil Artin

- First edition
- Author: Emil Artin
- Language: English
- Series: Tracts in Pure and Applied Mathematics
- Subject: Mathematics
- Genre: Textbook
- Published: 1957
- Publisher: Interscience Publishers
- Pages: 214

Geometric Algebra is a book written by Emil Artin and published by Interscience Publishers, New York, in 1957. It was republished in 1988 in the Wiley Classics series (ISBN 0-471-60839-4).

In 1962 Algèbre Géométrique, a translation into French by Michel Lazard, was published by Gauthier-Villars, and reprinted in 1996. (ISBN 2-87647-089-6) In 1968 and 1969, translations into Italian and Russian were published by Feltrinelli and Nauka respectively.

Long anticipated as the sequel to Moderne Algebra (1930), which Bartel van der Waerden published as his version of notes taken in a course with Artin, Geometric Algebra is a research monograph suitable for graduate students studying mathematics. From the Preface:

Linear algebra, topology, differential and algebraic geometry are the indispensable tools of the mathematician of our time. It is frequently desirable to devise a course of geometric nature which is distinct from these great lines of thought and which can be presented to beginning graduate students or even to advanced undergraduates. The present book has grown out of lecture notes for a course of this nature given at New York University in 1955. This course centered around the foundations of affine geometry, the geometry of quadratic forms and the structure of the general linear group. I felt it necessary to enlarge the content of these notes by including projective and symplectic geometry and also the structure of the symplectic and orthogonal groups.

The book is illustrated with six geometric configurations in chapter 2, which retraces the path from geometric to field axioms previously explored by Karl von Staudt and David Hilbert.

== Contents ==
Chapter one is titled "Preliminary Notions". The ten sections explicate notions of set theory, vector spaces, homomorphisms, duality, linear equations, group theory, field theory, ordered fields and valuations. On page vii Artin says "Chapter I should be used mainly as a reference chapter for the proofs of certain isolated theorems."

Pappus's hexagon theorem holds if and only if k is commutative

Chapter two is titled "Affine and Projective Geometry". Artin posits this challenge to generate algebra (a field k) from geometric axioms:

Given a plane geometry whose objects are the elements of two sets, the set of points and the set of lines; assume that certain axioms of a geometric nature are true. Is it possible to find a field k such that the points of our geometry can be described by coordinates from k and the lines by linear equations ?

The reflexive variant of parallelism is invoked: parallel lines have either all or none of their points in common. Thus a line is parallel to itself.

Axiom 1 requires a unique line for each pair of distinct points, and a unique point of intersection of non-parallel lines. Axiom 2 depends on a line and a point; it requires a unique parallel to the line and through the point. Axiom 3 requires three non-collinear points. Axiom 4a requires a translation to move any point to any other. Axiom 4b requires a dilation at P to move Q to R when the three points are collinear.

Artin writes the line through P and Q as P + Q. To define a dilation he writes, "Let two distinct points P and Q and their images P′ and Q′ be given." To suggest the role of incidence in geometry, a dilation is specified by this property: "If l′ is the line parallel to P + Q which passes through P′, then Q′ lies on l′." Of course, if P′ ≠ Q′, then this condition implies P + Q is parallel to P′ + Q′, so that the dilation is an affine transformation.

The dilations with no fixed points are translations, and the group of translations T is shown to be an invariant subgroup of the group of dilations. For a dilation σ and a point P, the trace is P + σP. The mappings T → T that are trace-preserving homomorphisms are the elements of k. First k is shown to be an associative ring with 1, then a skew field.

Conversely, there is an affine geometry based on any given skew field k. Axioms 4a and 4b are equivalent to Desargues' theorem. When Pappus's hexagon theorem holds in the affine geometry, k is commutative and hence a field.

Chapter three is titled "Symplectic and Orthogonal Geometry". It begins with metric structures on vector spaces before defining symplectic and orthogonal geometry and describing their common and special features. There are sections on geometry over finite fields and over ordered fields.

Chapter four is on general linear groups. First there is Jean Dieudonne's theory of determinants over "non-commutative fields" (division rings). Artin describes GL(n, k) group structure. More details are given about vector spaces over finite fields.

Chapter five is "The Structure of Symplectic and Orthogonal Groups". It includes sections on elliptic spaces, Clifford algebra, and spinorial norm.

== Reviews ==
Alice T. Schafer wrote "Mathematicians will find on many pages ample evidence of the author’s ability to penetrate a subject and to present material in a particularly elegant manner." She notes the overlap between Artin's text and Baer's Linear Algebra and Projective Geometry or Dieudonné's La Géometrie des Groupes Classique.

Jean Dieudonné reviewed the book for Mathematical Reviews and placed it on a level with Hilbert's Grundlagen der Geometrie.
