= Frobenius's theorem (group theory) =

Theorem of group theory

In mathematics, specifically group theory, Frobenius's theorem states that if $n$ divides the order of a finite group $G$, then the number of solutions of $x^n=1$ in $G$ is a multiple of $n$. It was introduced by Frobenius (1903).

== Statement ==
A more general version of Frobenius's theorem states that if $C$ is a conjugacy class with $h$ elements of a finite group $G$ with $g$ elements and $n$ is a positive integer, then the number of elements $k$ such that $k^n$ is in $C$ is a multiple of the greatest common divisor $(hn,g)$ (Hall 1959, theorem 9.1.1).

== Applications ==
One application of Frobenius's theorem is to show that the coefficients of the Artin–Hasse exponential are $p$-integral, by interpreting them in terms of the number of elements of order a power of $p$ in the symmetric group $S_n$.

== Frobenius's conjecture ==
Frobenius conjectured that if, in addition, the number of solutions to $x^n=1$ is exactly $n$, where $n$ divides the order of $G$, then these solutions form a normal subgroup. This was proved by Iiyori and Yamaki as a consequence of the classification of finite simple groups.

The symmetric group $S_3$ has exactly $4$ solutions to $x^4=1$ but these do not form a normal subgroup; this is not a counterexample to the conjecture as $4$ does not divide $|S_3| = 6$.
