= Ferdinand Georg Frobenius =

German mathematician (1849–1917)

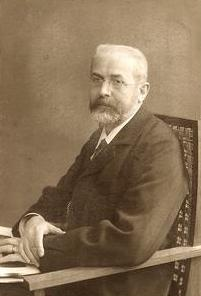
- Ferdinand Georg Frobenius
- Born: 26 October 1849; Charlottenburg, Berlin, Kingdom of Prussia
- Died: 3 August 1917 (aged 67); Berlin, Kingdom of Prussia, German Empire
- Education: University of Göttingen; University of Berlin
- Known for: Differential equations Group theory Cayley–Hamilton theorem Frobenius method Frobenius matrix Frobenius inner product
- Scientific career
- Fields: Mathematics
- Workplaces: University of Berlin; ETH Zurich
- Doctoral advisor: Karl Weierstrass; Ernst Kummer
- Doctoral students: Richard Fuchs; Edmund Landau; Issai Schur; Konrad Knopp; Walter Schnee

Ferdinand Georg Frobenius (26 October 1849 – 3 August 1917) was a German mathematician, best known for his contributions to the theory of elliptic functions, differential equations, number theory, and to group theory. He is known for the famous determinantal identities, known as Frobenius–Stickelberger formulae, governing elliptic functions, and for developing the theory of biquadratic forms. He was also the first to introduce the notion of rational approximations of functions (nowadays known as Padé approximants), and gave the first full proof for the Cayley–Hamilton theorem. He also lent his name to certain differential-geometric objects in modern mathematical physics, known as Frobenius manifolds.

== Biography ==
Ferdinand Georg Frobenius was born on 26 October 1849 in Charlottenburg, a suburb of Berlin, from parents Christian Ferdinand Frobenius, a Protestant parson, and Christine Elizabeth Friedrich. He entered the Joachimsthal Gymnasium in 1860 when he was nearly eleven.

In 1867, after graduating, he went to the University of Göttingen, where he began his university studies. However, he studied there for only one semester before returning to Berlin, where he attended lectures by Leopold Kronecker, Ernst Kummer and Karl Weierstrass. He received his doctorate (awarded with distinction) in 1870 supervised by Weierstrass. His thesis was on the solution of differential equations. In 1874, after having taught at secondary school level — first at the Joachimsthal Gymnasium, then at the Sophienrealschule — he was appointed to the University of Berlin as an extraordinary professor of mathematics.

Frobenius was in Berlin only a year before he went to Zürich to take up an appointment as an ordinary professor at the Polytechnikum, today's ETH Zurich. For seventeen years, between 1875 and 1892, Frobenius worked in Zürich. It was there that he married, brought up his family, and did much important work in widely differing areas of mathematics.

In the last days of December 1891, Kronecker died, and therefore his chair in Berlin became vacant. Weierstrass, strongly believing that Frobenius was the right person to keep Berlin in the forefront of mathematics, used his considerable influence to have Frobenius appointed. In 1893 he returned to Berlin, where he was elected to the Prussian Academy of Sciences.

== Contributions to group theory ==
Group theory was one of Frobenius' principal interests in the second half of his career. One of his first contributions was the proof of the Sylow theorems for abstract groups. Earlier proofs had been for permutation groups. His proof of the first Sylow theorem (on the existence of Sylow groups) is one of those frequently used today.

- Frobenius also proved the following fundamental theorem: If a positive integer n divides the order |G| of a finite group G, then the number of solutions of the equation x^{n} = 1 in G is equal to k n for some positive integer k .
- He also posed the following conjecture: If, in the above theorem, k = 1 , then the solutions of the equation x^{n} = 1 in G form a subgroup.

Many years ago this conjecture was proved correct for solvable groups. Only in 1991, after the classification of finite simple groups, was this problem solved in general.

More important was his creation of the theory of group characters and group representations, which are fundamental tools for studying the structure of groups. This work led to the notion of Frobenius reciprocity and the definition of what are now called Frobenius groups. A group G is said to be a Frobenius group if there is a subgroup H < G such that

$\ H\ \cap\ H^x = \{\ 1\ \}\quad$ for all $\quad x \in G\ \backslash\ H ~.$

In that case, the set

$$\ N = G\ \backslash \!\!\!\bigcup_{x\in\ G\ \backslash\ H}\!\!\! H^x\$$

together with the identity element of G forms a subgroup which is nilpotent as John G. Thompson showed in 1959. All known proofs of that theorem make use of characters. In his first paper about characters (1896), Frobenius constructed the character table of the group $\ \mathrm{PSL}(2,p)\$ of order $\ \tfrac{1}{2}\left(\ p^3 - p\ \right)\$ for all odd primes p (this is a simple group provided p > 3 ). He also made fundamental contributions to the representation theory of the symmetric and alternating groups.

== Contributions to number theory ==
Frobenius introduced a canonical way of turning primes into conjugacy classes in Galois groups over Q. Specifically, if K/Q is a finite Galois extension then to each (positive) prime p which does not ramify in K and to each prime ideal P lying over p in K there is a unique element g of Gal(K/Q) satisfying the condition g(x) = x^{p} (mod P) for all integers x of K. Varying P over p changes g into a conjugate (and every conjugate of g occurs in this way), so the conjugacy class of g in the Galois group is canonically associated to p. This is called the Frobenius conjugacy class of p and any element of the conjugacy class is called a Frobenius element of p. If we take for K the mth cyclotomic field, whose Galois group over Q is the units modulo m (and thus is abelian, so conjugacy classes become elements), then for p not dividing m the Frobenius class in the Galois group is p mod m. From this point of view, the distribution of Frobenius conjugacy classes in Galois groups over Q (or, more generally, Galois groups over any number field) generalizes Dirichlet's classical result about primes in arithmetic progressions. The study of Galois groups of infinite-degree extensions of Q depends crucially on this construction of Frobenius elements, which provides in a sense a dense subset of elements which are accessible to detailed study.

== Differential equations ==
Frobenius made important contributions to the solution of linear variable-coefficient ordinary differential equations by elaborating on the resolution of power-series methods applied at singular-points where standard Taylor-series methods fail. His algorithm is now referred to as the Frobenius method.

== See also ==
- List of things named after Ferdinand Georg Frobenius

== Publications ==
- Frobenius, Ferdinand Georg (1968), Serre, J.-P. (ed.), Gesammelte Abhandlungen. Bände I, II, III, Berlin, New York: Springer-Verlag, ISBN 978-3-540-04120-7, MR 0235974
- De functionum analyticarum unius variabilis per series infinitas repraesentatione (in Latin), Dissertation, 1870
- Über die Entwicklung analytischer Functionen in Reihen, die nach gegebenen Functionen fortschreiten (in German), Journal für die reine und angewandte Mathematik 73, 1–30 (1871)
- Über die algebraische Auflösbarkeit der Gleichungen, deren Coefficienten rationale Functionen einer Variablen sind (in German), Journal für die reine und angewandte Mathematik 74, 254–272 (1872)
- Über den Begriff der Irreductibilität in der Theorie der linearen Differentialgleichungen (in German), Journal für die reine und angewandte Mathematik 76, 236–270 (1873)
- Über die Integration der linearen Differentialgleichungen durch Reihen (in German), Journal für die reine und angewandte Mathematik 76, 214–235 (1873)
- Über die Determinante mehrerer Functionen einer Variablen (in German), Journal für die reine und angewandte Mathematik 77, 245–257 (1874)
- Über die Vertauschung von Argument und Parameter in den Integralen der linearen Differentialgleichungen (in German), Journal für die reine und angewandte Mathematik 78, 93–96 (1874)
- Anwendungen der Determinantentheorie auf die Geometrie des Maaßes (in German), Journal für die reine und angewandte Mathematik 79, 185–247 (1875)
- Über algebraisch integrirbare lineare Differentialgleichungen (in German), Journal für die reine und angewandte Mathematik 80, 183–193 (1875)
- Über das Pfaffsche Problem (in German), Journal für die reine und angewandte Mathematik 82, 230–315 (1875)
- Über die regulären Integrale der linearen Differentialgleichungen (in German), Journal für die reine und angewandte Mathematik 80, 317–333 (1875)
- Note sur la théorie des formes quadratiques à un nombre quelconque de variables (in French), Comptes rendus de l'Académie des sciences Paris 85, 131–133 (1877)
- Zur Theorie der elliptischen Functionen (in German), Journal für die reine und angewandte Mathematik 83, 175–179 (1877)
- Über adjungirte lineare Differentialausdrücke (in German), Journal für die reine und angewandte Mathematik 85, 185–213 (1878)
- Über lineare Substitutionen und bilineare Formen (in German), Journal für die reine und angewandte Mathematik 84, 1–63 (1878)
- Über homogene totale Differentialgleichungen (in German), Journal für die reine und angewandte Mathematik 86, 1–19 (1879)
- Frobenius, G. (1881). "Ueber Relationen zwischen den Näherungsbrüchen von Potenzreihen". Journal für die reine und angewandte Mathematik. 90: 1–17.
- Ueber Matrizen aus nicht negativen Elementen (in German), Sitzungsberichte der Königlich Preussischen Akademie der Wissenschaften 26, 456—477 (1912)
- Frobenius, G. (1913). "Ueber die Markoffschen Zahlen". Sitzungsberichte der Koniglich Preussischen Akademie der Wissenschaften: 458–487.
