= Amplitude damping channel =

Quantum channel

In the theory of quantum communication, an amplitude damping channel is a quantum channel that models physical processes such as spontaneous emission. A natural process by which this channel can occur is a spin chain through which a number of spin states, coupled by a time independent Hamiltonian, can be used to send a quantum state from one location to another. The resulting quantum channel ends up being identical to an amplitude damping channel, for which the quantum capacity, the classical capacity and the entanglement assisted classical capacity of the quantum channel can be evaluated.

== Qubit channel ==
We consider here the amplitude damping channel in the case of a single qubit.

Any quantum channel can be defined in several equivalent ways. For example, via Stinespring's dilation theorem, a channel $\mathcal D$ can be represented via an isometry $V$ as $\mathcal D(\rho) = \operatorname{tr}_2[V\rho V^\dagger]$, and we say in this case that $V$ is the Stinespring representation of $\mathcal D$. In particular, the single-qubit amplitude damping channel has Stinespring representation $V$ given by
$$V|0\rangle = |0,0\rangle,
\qquad
V|1\rangle = \sqrt{1-p} |0,1\rangle + \sqrt{p} |1,0\rangle.$$
An alternative equivalent representation is given via Kraus operators. This means to represent the action of the channel in the form
$$\mathcal N(\rho) = \sum_j K_j \rho K_j^\dagger$$
for some set of operators $K_j$ such that $\sum_j K_j^\dagger K_j=I$. For the amplitude damping channel, one choice of such representation reads
$$\mathcal N(\rho) = K_0 \rho K_0^\dagger + K_1 \rho K_1^\dagger$$
with
$$K_0 = \begin{pmatrix}1&0\\0&\sqrt{1-p}\end{pmatrix},
\qquad K_1 = \begin{pmatrix}0&\sqrt{p} \\ 0 & 0\end{pmatrix}\;.$$
More explicitly, we thus have

$${\cal N}_p\left[\begin{pmatrix}\rho_{00}&\rho_{01}\\\rho_{10}&\rho_{11}\end{pmatrix}\right] = \begin{pmatrix}\rho_{00}+p \rho_{11} & \sqrt{1-p} \rho_{01} \\ \sqrt{1-p} \rho_{10} & (1-p) \rho_{11}\end{pmatrix}\;.$$

== Model for a spin chain quantum channel ==
The main construct of the quantum channel based on spin chain correlations is to have a collection of N coupled spins. At either side of the quantum channel, there are two groups of spins and we refer to these as quantum registers, A and B. A message is sent by having the sender of the message encode some information on register A, and then, after letting it propagate over some time t, having the receiver later retrieve it from B. The state $\rho_{A}$ is prepared on A by first decoupling the spins on A from those on the remainder of the chain. After preparation, $\rho_{A}$ is allowed to interact with the state on the remainder of the chain, which initially has the state $\sigma_{0}$. The state of the spin chain as time progresses can be described by $R(t) = U(t)(\rho_{A} \otimes \sigma_{0})U^{\dagger}(t)$. From this relationship we can obtain the state of the spins belonging to register B by tracing away all other states of the chain.

$\rho_B(t)= \mbox{Tr}^{(B)} [ U(t) (\rho_A \otimes \sigma_0) U^{\dagger}(t)]$

This gives the mapping below, which describes how the state on A is transformed as a function of time as it is transmitted over the quantum channel to B. U(t) is just some unitary matrix which describes the evolution of the system as a function of time.

$\rho_A \rightarrow \mathcal{M}(\rho_A ) \equiv \rho_B(t)= \mbox{Tr}^{(B)} [ U(t) (\rho_A \otimes \sigma_0) U^{\dagger}(t)]$

There are, however, a few issues with this description of the quantum channel. One of the assumptions involved with using such a channel is that we expect that the states of the chain are not disturbed. While it may be possible for a state to be encoded on A without disturbing the chain, a reading of the state from B will influence the states of the rest of the spin chain. Thus, any repeated manipulation of the registers A and B will have an unknown impact on the quantum channel. Given this fact, solving the capacities of this mapping would not be generally useful, since it will only apply when several copies of the chain are operating in parallel. In order to calculate meaningful values for these capacities, the simple model below allows for the capacities to be solved exactly.

=== Solvable model ===
A spin chain, which is composed of a chain of particles with spin 1/2 coupled through a ferromagnetic Heisenberg interaction, is used, and is described by the Hamiltonian: $H=-\sum_{\langle i,j \rangle} \hbar J_{ij} \left({\sigma}_x^{i}{\sigma}_x^{j} +{\sigma}_y^{i}{\sigma}_y^{j}+\gamma {\sigma}_z^{i}{\sigma}_z^{j}\right)-\sum_{i=1}^{N} \hbar B_i \sigma_z^{i}$

It is assumed that the input register, A and the output register B occupy the first k and last k spins along the chain, and that all spins along the chain are prepared to be in the spin down state in the z direction. The parties then use all k of their spin states to encode/decode a single qubit. The motivation for this method is that if all k spins were allowed to be used, we would have a k-qubit channel, which would be too complex to be completely analyzed. Clearly, a more effective channel would make use of all k spins, but by using this inefficient method, it is possible to look at the resulting maps analytically.

To carry out the encoding of a single bit using the k available bits, a one-spin up vector is defined $|j \rangle$, in which all spins are in the spin down state except for the j-th one, which is in the spin up state.

$| { j}\rangle \equiv \left|\downarrow \downarrow \cdots \downarrow \uparrow \downarrow \cdots \downarrow \right\rangle$

The sender prepares his set of k input spins as:

$|\Psi\rangle_A \equiv \alpha \left|\Downarrow\right\rangle_A + \beta|\phi_1 \rangle_A$

where $\left|\Downarrow\right\rangle$ is the state where all positions have spin down, and $|\phi_1 \rangle$ is the superposition of all possible one-spin up states. Using this input, it is possible to find a state which describes the whole chain at a given time t. From such a state, tracing out the N-k spins not belonging to the receiver, as we would have done with the earlier model, leaves the state on B:

$\rho_B(t) = (|\alpha|^2 + (1-\eta) |\beta|^2) \left| \Downarrow \right\rangle_B\left\langle \Downarrow \right| + \eta |\beta|^2 |\phi_1^{\prime}\rangle_B \langle \phi_1^{\prime}|+ \sqrt{\eta} \alpha \beta^* \left| \Downarrow \right\rangle_B\langle \phi_1^{\prime} | + \sqrt{\eta} \alpha^* \beta | \phi_1^{\prime} \rangle_B\left\langle \Downarrow \right|$

where $\eta$ is a constant defining the efficiency of the channel. If we represent the states in which one spin is up to be $|1 \rangle$ and those where all spins are down to be $| 0 \rangle$, this becomes recognizable as the result of applying the amplitude damping channel $\mathcal{D}_n$, characterized by the following Kraus operators:

$A_0 = |0\rangle\langle 0| +\sqrt{\eta}|1\rangle \langle 1|$; $A_1 = \sqrt{1-\eta}|0\rangle \langle 1|$

Evidently, the fact that an amplitude damping channel describes the transmission of quantum states across the spin chain stems from the fact that Hamiltonian of the system conserves energy. While energy can be spread out as the one-spin up state is transferred along the chain, it is not possible for spins in the down state to suddenly gain energy and become spin up states.

== Capacities of the amplitude damping channel ==
By describing the spin-chain as an amplitude damping channel, it is possible to calculate the various capacities associated with the channel. One useful property of this channel, which is used to find these capacities, is the fact that two amplitude damping channels with efficiencies $\eta$ and $\eta'$ can be concatenated. Such a concatenation gives a new channel of efficiency $\eta$$\eta'$.

=== Quantum capacity ===
In order to calculate the quantum capacity, the map $\mathcal{D}_\eta$ is represented as follows:

$\mathcal{D}_\eta (\rho) \equiv \mbox{Tr}_C [ V \left( \rho \otimes |0 \rangle_C \langle 0| \right) V^{\dagger}]\;.$

This representation of the map is obtained by adding an auxiliary Hilbert space $\mathcal{H}_C$ to that of $\mathcal{H}_A$. and introducing an operator V which operates on A and C. A complementary channel, $\tilde{\mathcal{D}}_\eta$ is also defined, where instead of tracing over C, we trace over A. A swapping operation S which transforms A into C is defined. Using this operation, as well as the rule for concatenation of amplitude damping channels, it is shown that for $\eta \geqslant 0.5$:

$\tilde{\mathcal{D}}_\eta (\rho) = S \mathcal{D}_{(1-\eta)/\eta} \left({\mathcal{D}}_{\eta} (\rho)\right)\;.$

This relationship demonstrates that the channel is degradable, which guarantees that the coherent information of the channel is additive. This implies that the quantum capacity is achieved for a single channel use.

An amplitude damping mapping is applied to a general input state, and from this mapping, the von Neumann entropy of the output is found as:

$S(\mathcal{D}_{\eta} (\rho)) = H_2 (\left(1 + \sqrt{(1- 2\,\eta\, p)^2 + 4\,\eta\, |\gamma|^2} \right)/2)\;,$

where $p\in[0,1]$ with state $|1 \rangle$ and $|\gamma|\leqslant \sqrt{(1-p)p}$ is a coherence term. By looking at a purification of the state, it is found that:

$S((\mathcal{D}_{\eta} \otimes1_{anc}) (\Phi)) = H_2 (\left(1 + \sqrt{(1- 2\,(1-\eta)\, p)^2 + 4\,(1-\eta)\, |\gamma|^2} \right)/2)$

In order to maximize the quantum capacity, we choose that $\gamma = 0$ (due to concavity of entropy, which yields the following as the quantum capacity:

$Q \equiv \max_{p\in[0,1]} \; \Big\{ \; H_2 (\eta\, p) - H_2((1-\eta)\, p)\; \Big\}\;$

Finding the quantum capacity for $\eta < 0.5$ is straightforward, as the quantum capacity vanishes as a direct result of the no-cloning theorem. The fact that channels can be composed in this fashion implies that quantum capacity of the channel must increase as a function of $\eta$.

=== Entanglement assisted classical capacity ===
To calculate the entanglement assisted capacity we must maximize the quantum mutual information. This is found by adding the input entropy of the message to the derived coherent information in the previous section. It is again maximized for $\gamma = 0$. Thus, the entanglement assisted classical capacity is found to be

$C_E \equiv \max_{p\in[0,1]} \; \Big\{ \; H_2( p) + H_2 (\eta\, p) - H_2((1-\eta)\, p)\; \Big\}\;$

=== Classical capacity ===
We now calculate C1, which is the maximum amount of classical information that can be transmitted by non-entangled encodings over parallel channel uses. This quantity acts as a lower bound for the classical capacity, C. To find C1, the classical capacity is maximized for n=1. We consider an ensemble of messages, each with probability $\xi_{k}$. The Holevo information is found to be:

$\chi \equiv H_2 \left(\frac{1 + \sqrt{(1- 2 \,\eta\,p)^2 +4 \,\eta\, |\gamma|^2}}{2} \right)-\sum_k \xi_k H_2 \left(\frac{1 + \sqrt{(1- 2 \,\eta\,p_k)^2 +4 \,\eta\, |\gamma_k|^2}}{2} \right)\;$

In this expression, $p_k$ and $\gamma_k$ are the population and a coherence term, as defined before, and $p$ and $\gamma$ are the average values of these.

In order to find C1, first an upper bound is found for C1, and then a set of $p_k,\gamma_k,\xi_k$ are found that satisfy this bound. As before, $\gamma$ is set to be 0 in order to maximize the first term of Holevo information. From here we use the fact that the binary entropy $H_2(z)$ is decreasing with respect to $|1/2 + z|$ as well as the fact that $H_2(1 + \sqrt{1-z^2}/2)$ is convex with respect to z to find the following inequality:

$\sum_k \xi_k H_2 \left(\frac{1 + \sqrt{(1- 2 \,\eta\,p_k)^2+4 \,\eta\, |\gamma_k|^2}}{2} \right) \geqslant H_2 \left(\frac{1 + \sqrt{1- 4 \,\eta\,(1-\eta) (\sum_k \xi_k p_k)^2}}{2} \right)$

By maximizing over all choices of p, the following upper bound for C1 is found:

$C_1 \leqslant \max_{p\in[0,1]} \Big\{ H_2 \left(\eta \, p \right)- H_2 \left(\frac{1 + \sqrt{1- 4 \,\eta\,(1-\eta) \,p ^2}}{2} \right) \Big\} \;$

This upper bound is found to be the value for C1, and the parameters that realize this bound are $\xi_k=1/d \,\!$,$p_k=p \,\!$, and $\gamma_k=e^{2\pi i k/d} \sqrt{(1-p)p}$.

=== Numerical analysis of the capacities ===
From the expressions for the various capacities, it is possible to carry out a numerical analysis on them. For an $\eta$ of 1, the three capacities are maximized, which leads to the quantum and classical capacities both being 1, and the Entanglement assisted classical capacity being 2. As mentioned earlier, the quantum capacity is 0 for any $\eta$ less than 0.5, while the classical capacity and the entanglement assisted classical capacity reach 0 for $\eta$ of 0. When $\eta$ is less than 0.5, too much information is lost to the environment for quantum information to be sent to the receiving party.

== Effectiveness of spin-chains as a quantum communication channel ==
Having calculated the capacities for the amplitude damping channel as a function of the efficiency of the channel, it is possible to analyze the effectiveness of such a channel as a function of distance between the encoding site and the decoding site. Bose demonstrated that the efficiency drops as a function of $|r-s|^{-2/3}$, where r is the position of the decoding and s is the position of encoding. Due to the fact that the quantum capacity vanishes for $\eta$ less than 0.5, this means that the distance between the sender and the receiver must be very short in order for any quantum information to be transmitted. Therefore, long spin chains are not suitable to transmit quantum information.
