= Entanglement-assisted classical capacity =

Maximum rate of a quantum channel

In the theory of quantum communication, the entanglement-assisted classical capacity of a quantum channel is the highest rate at which classical information can be transmitted from a sender to receiver when they share an unlimited amount of noiseless entanglement. It is given by the quantum mutual information of the channel, which is the input-output quantum mutual information maximized over all pure bipartite quantum states with one system transmitted through the channel. This formula is the natural generalization of Shannon's noisy channel coding theorem, in the sense that this formula is equal to the capacity, and there is no need to regularize it. An additional feature that it shares with Shannon's formula is that a noiseless classical or quantum feedback channel cannot increase the entanglement-assisted classical capacity. The entanglement-assisted classical capacity theorem is proved in two parts: the direct coding theorem and the converse theorem. The direct coding theorem demonstrates that the quantum mutual information of the channel is an achievable rate, by a random coding strategy that is effectively a noisy version of the super-dense coding protocol. The converse theorem demonstrates that this rate is optimal by making use of the strong subadditivity of quantum entropy.

== See also ==
- Classical capacity
- Quantum capacity
- Typical subspace
