= Masanori Ohya =

Japanese mathematician

- Born: 1947 (age 78–79)
- Scientific career
- Fields: Mathematics

Masanori Ohya (大矢 雅則, Ōya Masanori; born 1947) is a Japanese mathematician.

After he received a Ph.D. in Mathematical Physics and Information Science and Dr.Sc., he continuously worked on operator algebra, quantum entropy, quantum information theory and bio-information. He achieved results in the fields of quantum information and mathematical physics. In particular, he proposed his version of quantum mutual entropy. Note this quantity is not the same as Holevo's chi quantity or coherent information, though each of them plays important role in quantum information theory. The information theoretic meaning of Ohya's quantum mutual information is still obscure.

He also proposed 'Information Dynamics' and 'Adaptive Dynamics', which he applied to the study of chaos theory, quantum information and biosciences as related fields.

== Main research ==
Ohya studied multiple topics for more than thirty years, relating to quantum entropy, quantum information, chaos dynamics and life science. His main accomplishments are as follows:

1. Elucidation of Mathematical Bases of Quantum Channels,
2. Formulation of Quantum Mutual Information (Entropy),
3. Information Dynamics,
4. Analysis of Quantum Teleportation,
5. Quantum Algorithm,
6. Proposal of Adaptive Dynamics,
7. Applications to the life sciences.

They are explained in this book Watanabe 2007.

== Academic and other appointments ==
Academic Appointments:

- 1987–present: Professor, Department of Information Sciences, Tokyo University of Science
- 2004–2006 Dean, Graduate School of Science and Technology, Tokyo University of Science
- 2002–2006 Committee, International Institute of Advanced Study in Kyoto
- 2006–present: Dean, Science and Technology, Tokyo University of Science

Università di Roma II, Copernicus University, Jena University and many others.

Member of the Editorial Board of International Journals:

1. Infinite Dimensional Analysis, Quantum Probability and Related Topics;
2. Reports on Mathematical Physics;
3. Editor-in-chief of the Editorial Board of the journal Open Systems & Information Dynamics
4. Amino Acid

== Books (English only) ==
- M.Ohya and D. Petz (1993) Quantum Entropy and its Use, Springer-Verlag, TMP Series.
- R.S.Ingarden, A.Kossakowski and M.Ohya (1997), Information Dynamics and Open Systems, Kluwer Academic Publishers.
- M.Ohya (1999), Mathematical foundation of quantum computer, Maruzen Publishing Company.
