= Dénes Petz =

Hungarian mathematical physicist and quantum information theorist (1953–2018)

- Born: April 8, 1953; Budapest, Hungary
- Died: February 6, 2018 (aged 64); Budapest, Hungary
- Citizenship: Hungarian
- Education: Eötvös Loránd University
- Known for: Quantum Stein's lemma Petz recovery map monotone metric typical subspace theorem variational formula for the quantum relative entropy
- Awards: Albert Szent-Gyorgyi Prize (2009), Officer’s Cross of the Hungarian Order of Merit (2013)
- Scientific career
- Fields: mathematical physics, quantum information, free probability, operator algebras, matrix analysis
- Workplaces: Budapest University of Technology and Economics, Alfréd Rényi Institute of Mathematics, Eötvös Loránd University

Dénes Petz (1953–2018) was a Hungarian mathematical physicist and quantum information theorist. He is well known for his work on quantum entropy inequalities and equality conditions, quantum f-divergences, sufficiency in quantum statistical inference, quantum Fisher information, and the related concept of monotone metrics in quantum information geometry. He proposed the first quantum generalization of Rényi relative entropy and established its data processing inequality.

He has written or coauthored several textbooks which have been widely read by experts in quantum information theory. He has also coauthored a book in the area of mathematical physics.

== Personal life ==
He was born in Budapest, Hungary, on April 8, 1953.

== Education ==
He received the M.Sc. degree in mathematics from the Eötvös Loránd University, Budapest, Hungary, in 1977 and the Ph.D. degree in mathematics from the Eötvös Loránd University, Budapest, Hungary, in 1979. In 1982, he received the qualification "Candidate of the Mathematical Sciences" from the Hungarian Academy of Sciences with the thesis "Reduction Theory of Operator Algebras," and in 1989, he received the qualification "Doctor of the Mathematical Sciences" from the Hungarian Academy of Sciences with the thesis "Stochastical Aspects of Operator Algebras."

== Career ==
From 1982 to 1989, he was a researcher at the Alfréd Rényi Institute of Mathematics of the Hungarian Academy of Science of the Hungarian Academy of Sciences. From 1990 to 1995, he was the head of Section for Functional Analysis at the Alfréd Rényi Institute of Mathematics of the Hungarian Academy of Sciences. From 1992 until his death, he was full professor of mathematics at the Budapest University of Technology and Economics. From 1996 to 1999 and 2002–2006, he was chair of the Department for Mathematical Analysis at the Budapest University of Technology and Economics. From 1996 to 2004, he was vice director of the Mathematical Institute of the Budapest University of Technology and Economics. From 1998 to 2002, he was vice dean of the Faculty of Natural Sciences of the Budapest University of Technology and Economics. From 2004 until his death, he was research professor at the Alfréd Rényi Institute of Mathematics of the Hungarian Academy of Sciences. From 2008 until his death, he was professor of mathematics at the Eötvös Loránd University.

From 1992 until his death, he was an Editor of the journal Open Systems & Information Dynamics.

== Honors ==
- 2013: Officer's Cross of the Order of Merit of the Republic of Hungary
- 2009: Albert Szent-Györgyi Prize of the Ministry of Education
- 2008: Research Prize of the Hungarian Academy of Sciences
- 1997-2001: Széchenyi Professorship
- 1998: Farkas Bolyai Prize of the Hungarian Academy of Sciences
- 1997: Canon Fellow at the Tokyo University of Science (Japan)
- 1988: Prize for Young Scientists awarded by the Hungarian Academy of Sciences
- 1985-86: Alexander von Humboldt Fellowship
- 1982: Géza Grünwald Memorial Prize awarded by the János Bolyai Mathematical Society of Hungary

== See also ==
- quantum entropy
- quantum information theory
- quantum information geometry
- Rényi relative entropy
- quantum Fisher information
