= Alexander Holevo =

Russian mathematician

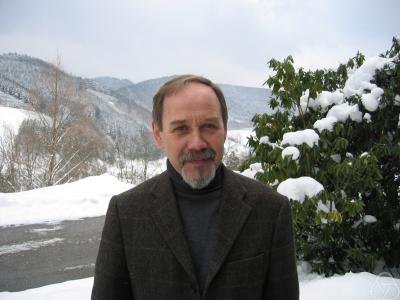
- Born: 2 September 1943; Russian SFSR, Soviet Union
- Education: Moscow Institute of Physics and Technology
- Known for: Holevo's theorem
- Scientific career
- Fields: Mathematician
- Workplaces: Steklov Mathematical Institute, Moscow State University, Moscow Institute of Physics and Technology
- Doctoral advisor: Yuri Anatolievich Rozanov

Alexander Semenovich Holevo (Russian: Алекса́ндр Семéнович Хóлево, also spelled as Kholevo and Cholewo) is a Soviet and Russian mathematician, one of the pioneers of quantum information science.

== Biography ==
Steklov Mathematical Institute, Moscow, since 1969. He graduated from Moscow Institute of Physics and Technology in 1966, defended a PhD Thesis in 1969 and a Doctor of Science Thesis in 1975. Since 1986 A.S. Holevo is a Professor (Moscow State University and Moscow Institute of Physics and Technology).

== Research ==
Holevo made substantial contributions in the mathematical foundations of quantum theory, quantum statistics and quantum information theory. In 1973 he obtained an upper bound for the amount of classical information that can be extracted from an ensemble of quantum states by quantum measurements (known as Holevo's theorem). Holevo developed the mathematical theory of quantum communication channels, the noncommutative theory of statistical decisions, proved coding theorems in quantum information theory and revealed the structure of quantum Markov semigroups and measurement processes. Holevo authored about one-hundred and seventy published works, including five monographs.

== Honours and awards ==
- Andrey Markov Prize of Russian Academy of Sciences (1997)
- Prizes for the best scientific achievements of Russian Academy of Sciences (1992, 1995, 2008)
- Quantum Communication Award (1996)
- Alexander von Humboldt Research Award (1999).
- Invited Speaker of the International Congress of Mathematicians, Madrid (2006)
- Claude E. Shannon Award (2016)

== Bibliography ==
- Holevo, A. S. (1973). "Bounds for the quantity of information transmitted by a quantum communication channel". Problems of Information Transmission. 9 (3): 177–183.
- Holevo, A. S. (1978). "Studies in general theory of statistical decisions". Proc. Steklov Math. Inst. 124. Steklov Mathematical Institute.
- Holevo, A. S. (1982). Probabilistic and statistical aspects of quantum theory. North Holland. ISBN 0-444-86333-8. 2011 pbk edition
- Holevo, A. S. (2001). "Statistical structure of quantum theory". Lect. Notes Phys. Monographs. Lecture Notes in Physics Monographs. 67. Springer. doi:10.1007/3-540-44998-1. ISBN 3-540-42082-7.
- Holevo, A. S. (2013). Quantum systems, channels, information. De Gruyter. ISBN 978-3-11-027325-0.

== See also ==
- History of quantum computing
- Werner–Holevo channels
