= Benjamin Schumacher =

American physicist

- Other names: Ben
- Citizenship: United States
- Occupation: Theoretical physicist
- Employer: Kenyon College
- Known for: Schumacher compression Quantum cellular automaton Coherent information Entanglement distillation No-broadcasting theorem
- Spouse: Carol Schumacher
- Children: 2 daughters
- Awards: 2002 Quantum Communication Award, International Organization for Quantum Communication, Measurement and Computing; Rosenbaum Fellowship, Isaac Newton Institute for Mathematical Sciences (1999). Robert M. Tomsich Science Award, Kenyon College (1996). University Fellowship, the University of Texas at Austin (1982–1984 and 1985–1986). National Science Foundation Graduate Fellowship (1982–1985). President's Medal for the outstanding graduating senior, Hendrix College (1982).
- Website: Benjamin Schumacher website

Benjamin "Ben" Schumacher is an American theoretical physicist, working mostly in the field of quantum information theory.

He discovered a way of interpreting quantum states as information. He came up with a way of compressing the information in a state, and storing the information in a smaller number of states. This is now known as Schumacher compression. This was the quantum analog of Shannon's noiseless coding theorem, and it helped to start the field known as quantum information theory.

Schumacher is also credited with inventing the term qubit along with William Wootters of Williams College, which is to quantum computation as a bit is to traditional computation.

He is the author of Physics in Spacetime, a textbook on Special Relativity, and Quantum Processes, Systems, and Information (with Michael Westmoreland), a textbook on Quantum Mechanics. Schumacher is a professor of physics at Kenyon College, a liberal arts college in rural Ohio. He is the lecturer in four courses produced by the Teaching Company: Black Holes, Tides, and Curved Spacetime: Understanding Gravity; Quantum Mechanics: The Physics of the Microscopic World; Impossible: Physics Beyond the Edge; and The Science of Information: From Language to Black Holes.

Schumacher earned his bachelor's degree at Hendrix College, where he met his wife, mathematician Carol Schumacher. His Ph.D. is from the University of Texas at Austin, where his advisers were Richard Matzner and John Archibald Wheeler.

== Influential research papers ==
- Schumacher, Benjamin (1995-04-01). "Quantum coding". Physical Review A. 51 (4). American Physical Society (APS): 2738–2747. Bibcode:1995PhRvA..51.2738S. doi:10.1103/physreva.51.2738. ISSN 1050-2947. PMID 9911903.

== See also ==
- Classical capacity
