= Seth Lloyd =

American quantum information scientist

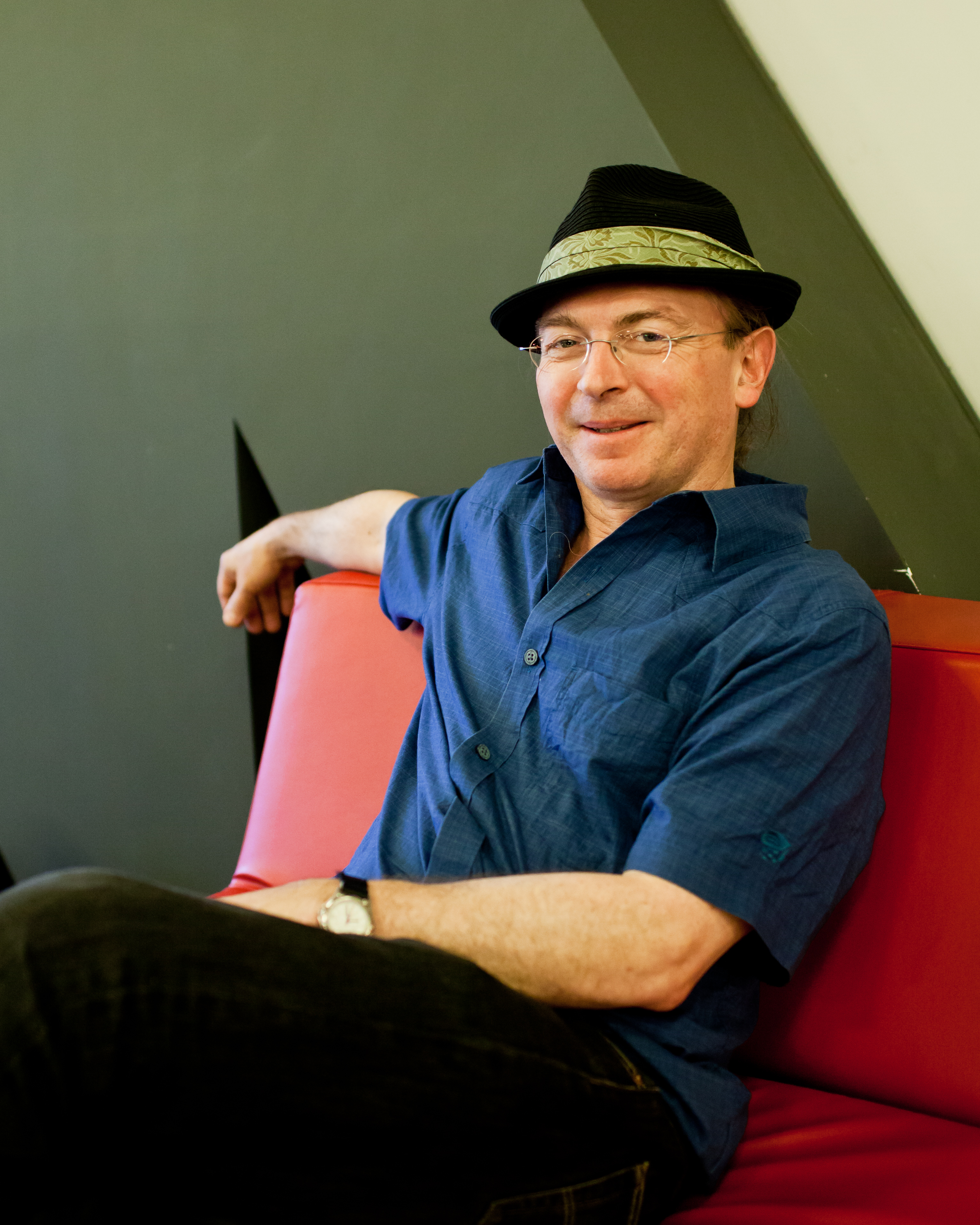
- Seth Lloyd in 2013
- Born: August 2, 1960 (age 66)
- Education: Phillips Academy; Harvard College; Cambridge University; Rockefeller University
- Known for: Coherent information Continuous-variable quantum information Dynamical decoupling Effective complexity HHL algorithm Quantum capacity Quantum illumination
- Scientific career
- Fields: Quantum information science
- Workplaces: MIT; Caltech; Los Alamos; Santa Fe Institute
- Doctoral advisor: Heinz Pagels

Seth Lloyd (born August 2, 1960) is an American quantum information scientist and professor in the Massachusetts Institute of Technology Department of Mechanical Engineering.

He is known for work in quantum information science, including work on designs for a quantum computer, quantum analog computation, quantum analogs of Shannon's theorem, and methods for quantum error correction and noise reduction.

== Biography ==
Lloyd was born on August 2, 1960. Lloyd's mother was Susan Lloyd, a history teacher at Phillips Andover. His maternal grandparents were Rustin McIntosh, a pediatrician, and Millicent Carey McIntosh, an educational administrator. His father, Robert Lloyd, was an art teacher at Phillips Andover. His paternal grandparents were teachers of history and dance at Phillips Exeter.

Lloyd graduated from Phillips Academy in 1978 and received a BA from Harvard College in 1982. He completed Part III and an MPhil from Cambridge University in 1983 and 1984 while on a Marshall Scholarship. Lloyd completed a PhD in physics at Rockefeller University in 1988 advised by Heinz Pagels.

From 1988 to 1991, Lloyd was a postdoctoral researcher at Caltech working with Murray Gell-Mann on applications of information to quantum systems, and from 1991 to 1994 he was a postdoctoral researcher at Los Alamos National Laboratory working on quantum computation. In 1994 he joined the mechanical engineering department at MIT. Lloyd has also been an external faculty member at the Santa Fe Institute.

In 2007 he was named a Fellow of the American Physical Society. In 2012 he was given the International Quantum Communication Award.

== Work ==
Lloyd directs the Center for Extreme Quantum Information Theory (xQIT) at MIT. He has made several contributions to quantum information science, including a proposal for a digital quantum simulator, a framework for quantum metrology, a treatment of continuous-variable quantum information, dynamical decoupling as a method of quantum error mitigation, and research on the possible relevance of quantum effects in biological phenomena, such as photosynthesis.

Lloyd's 1996 Science paper showed that a quantum computer can efficiently simulate quantum systems with local interactions, providing a proof of Feynman's earlier conjecture for that class of systems and helping establish the quantum computer as a universal quantum simulator.

With Aram Harrow and Avinatan Hassidim he introduced the HHL algorithm for solving systems of linear equations, and later several quantum machine learning algorithms based on it. These algorithms were widely thought to give an exponential speedup relative to the best classical algorithms, until the discovery by Ewin Tang of classical algorithms achieving the same exponential speedup.

In his 2006 book Programming the Universe, Lloyd argues that the universe can be understood as a quantum computer, with physical systems storing and processing information as they evolve according to the laws of physics. Reviewing the book in The New York Times Book Review, Corey S. Powell wrote that Lloyd presents the universe "as a majestic whole: an enormous computer". Lloyd also argued that, if computational power continued to increase according to Moore's law, it would reach the physical limits of the universe within roughly 600 years.

== Association with Jeffrey Epstein ==
Lloyd was introduced to Jeffrey Epstein by his literary agent John Brockman at the Edge Billionaires' Dinner in 2004.

Lloyd's ties to Epstein became a subject of public controversy in 2019, when reporting on Epstein's donations to MIT and other scientific institutions prompted an institutional inquiry. In 2019, Lloyd apologized for accepting $225,000 in research funding from Epstein. In a public statement, Lloyd said that he had visited Epstein during his prison term and had participated in discussions among scientists convened by Epstein after his release.

In January 2020, an extramural report commissioned by the MIT Corporation said that Epstein had made two $50,000 donations connected to Lloyd and claimed that Lloyd had taken steps "to obscure the fact that Epstein was the donor and to hinder any possible due diligence or vetting by MIT". Lloyd disputed that characterization.

In December 2020, MIT announced the conclusions of an internal faculty review. The review found that Lloyd had not attempted to circumvent MIT's donor-vetting process. However, a majority of the review committee concluded Lloyd had violated MIT policy by failing to disclose "crucial information about Epstein’s background". MIT imposed disciplinary restrictions, including temporary limits on fundraising and student advising. These restrictions have now been lifted.

== Selected publications ==
- Lloyd, Seth (1988). Black Holes, Demons and the Loss of Coherence: How complex systems get information, and what they do with it (PDF) (Ph.D. thesis). The Rockefeller University. Archived from the original (PDF) on 2012-06-07.
- Lloyd, S. (2000-08-31). "Ultimate physical limits to computation". Nature. 406 (6799): 1047–1054. arXiv:quant-ph/9908043v3. Bibcode:2000Natur.406.1047L. doi:10.1038/35023282. PMID 10984064. S2CID 75923.
- Lloyd, Seth (2001-10-24). "Computational capacity of the universe". Physical Review Letters. 88 (23) 237901. arXiv:quant-ph/0110141. doi:10.1103/PhysRevLett.88.237901. PMID 12059399. S2CID 6341263.
- Lloyd, S., Programming the Universe: A Quantum Computer Scientist Takes On the Cosmos, Knopf, March 14, 2006, 240 p., ISBN 1-4000-4092-2
- Lloyd, Seth (2008). "Quantum Mechanics and Emergence". In Abbott, Derek; Davies, Paul C. W.; Pati, Arun K. (eds.). Quantum Aspects of Life. Imperial College Press. ISBN 978-1-84816-253-2.
- Movie: In 2022 Lloyd starred in the short film Steeplechase directed by Andrey Kezzyn, which thematizes closed timelike curves, a topic Lloyd has also addressed in his scientific work.

== See also ==
- Quantum complexity theory
- Quantum Turing machine
- Quantum supremacy
