= Entropy exchange =

In quantum mechanics, and especially quantum information processing, the entropy exchange of a quantum operation $\phi \,$ acting on the density matrix $\rho_Q \,$ of a system $Q \,$ is defined as

$$S(\rho,\phi) \equiv S[Q',R'] = S(\rho_{QR}')$$

where $S(\rho_{QR}') \,$ is the von Neumann entropy of the system $Q \,$ and a fictitious purifying auxiliary system $R \,$ after they are operated on by $\phi \,$. Here,

$$\rho_{QR} = |QR\rangle\langle QR| \quad,$$
$$\mathrm{Tr}_R[\rho_{QR}] = \rho_Q \quad,$$

and

$$\rho_{QR}' = (\phi_{Q} \otimes 1_{R})[\rho_{QR}] \quad,$$

where in the above equation $(\phi_{Q} \otimes 1_{R})$ acts on $Q$ leaving $R$ unchanged.
