= Carol Schumacher =

Bolivian-born American mathematician

Carol Smith Schumacher (born 1960) is a Bolivian-born American mathematician specializing in real analysis, a mathematics educator, and a textbook author. She is a professor of mathematics at Kenyon College, and vice president of the Mathematical Association of America.

== Early life and education ==
Schumacher was born in La Paz, Bolivia as the daughter of missionaries, and grew up in Bolivia speaking both English and Spanish. She majored in mathematics at Hendrix College in Conway, Arkansas, and graduated with honors in 1982. It was in freshman calculus at Hendrix that she met her husband, physicist and quantum information theorist Benjamin Schumacher.

She went to the University of Texas at Austin for graduate study, and completed her Ph.D. in 1989 with a dissertation on the theory of Banach spaces, jointly supervised by Edward Odell and Haskell P. Rosenthal.

== Career and contributions ==
Schumacher joined Kenyon College as Dana Assistant Professor in 1988, has been full professor there since 2002, and has been department chair for several terms. She was elected vice president of the Mathematical Association of America for the 2018–2020 term.

Schumacher is the author of two inquiry-based learning textbooks: Chapter Zero: Fundamental Notions of Abstract Mathematics, on the transition to proofs (Addison-Wesley, 1996; 2nd edition, 2001) and Closer and Closer: Introducing Real Analysis, on real analysis (Jones and Bartlett, 2008).

== Recognition ==
Kenyon College gave Schumacher their Senior Trustee Teaching Excellence Award in 2005. She was the 2017 winner of the Distinguished Teaching Award of the Ohio Section of the Mathematical Association of America.

Schumacher is a 2023 recipient of one of the Deborah and Franklin Haimo Awards for Distinguished College or University Teaching of Mathematics.
