= Haskell P. Rosenthal =

American lecturer in mathematics

- Born: Haskell Paul Rosenthal; July 8, 1940; Bowman, North Dakota
- Died: December 5, 2021 (aged 81); Houston, Texas
- Known for: Functional analysis, Banach space
- Scientific career
- Fields: Mathematics
- Thesis: Projections onto Translation-Invariant Subspaces of $L^p(G)$ (1965)
- Doctoral advisor: Karel deLeeuw
- Doctoral students: Carol Schumacher

Haskell P. Rosenthal (July 8, 1940 – December 5, 2021) was an American lecturer in mathematics at the University of Texas at Austin who contributed to the study of functional analysis and Banach space.

== Early life and education ==
Haskell won the National Merit Scholarship when he was 16 years old. He went to MIT where he completed a bachelor's degree in mathematics at the age of 20. He then completed his PhD in mathematics at Stanford University, aged 24, under the supervision of Karel deLeeuw.

== Career and research ==
From 1966 – 1974, he was an associate professor at the mathematics department at University of California, Berkeley. During his time at UC Berkeley, he supervised 4 PhD students.

Rosenthal later joined the University of Texas at Austin in 1979, where he held the first chair endowed in the mathematics department, the John T. Stuart III Centennial Professor of Mathematics. He later retired with emeritus status in 2005 and returned to UC Berkeley to became a visiting lecturer from 2013 – 2015. During his time at the university, he supervised 9 PhD students.

Rosenthal published over 100 articles and manuscripts during his time at various institutions which were referenced an estimated 4,100 times.

== Selected publications ==
=== Books ===
- Rosenthal, Haskell P. (2003). "Chapter 36 - The Banach Spaces C(K)". Handbook of the Geometry of Banach Spaces. Elsevier.
- Rosenthal, Haskell P. (1966). Projections onto Translation-Invariant Subspaces of $L^p (G)$. American Mathematical Soc. ISBN 978-0-8218-1263-1.

=== Articles ===
- Kunen, Kenneth; Rosenthal, Haskell (1982). "Martingale proofs of some geometrical results in Banach space theory" (PDF). Pacific Journal of Mathematics. 100 (1): 153–175 – via msp.
- Rosenthal, Haskell P.; Troitsky, Vladimir G. (2005). "Strictly semi-transitive operator algebras". Journal of Operator Theory. 53 (2): 315–329. arXiv:math/0309014.
- Rosenthal, Haskell P. (1986). "Functional hilbertian sums" (PDF). Pacific Journal of Mathematics. 124 (2): 417–467 – via msp.
