= Coherent information =

Entropy measure

Coherent information is an entropy measure used in quantum information theory. It is a property of a quantum state ρ and a quantum channel $\mathcal{N}$; intuitively, it attempts to describe how much of the quantum information in the state will remain after the state goes through the channel. In this sense, it is intuitively similar to the mutual information of classical information theory. The coherent information is written $I(\rho, \mathcal{N})$.

== Definition ==
The coherent information is defined as $I(\rho, \mathcal{N})\ \stackrel{\mathrm{def}}{=}\ S(\mathcal{N} \rho) - S(\mathcal{N},\rho)$ where $S(\mathcal{N} \rho)$ is the von Neumann entropy of the output and $S({\mathcal N},\rho)$ is the entropy exchange between the state and the channel.

== History ==
The coherent information was introduced by Benjamin Schumacher and Michael A. Nielsen in a 1996 paper Quantum data processing and error correction, which appeared in Physical Review A. The same quantity was independently introduced by Seth Lloyd in a paper called “The capacity of the noisy quantum channel” published in Physical Review A.
