= Murder of Karel de Leeuw =

California murder

- Location: Stanford University, Stanford, California, U.S.
- Date: August 18, 1978
- Attack type: Murder (bludgeoning)
- Weapon: Ball-peen hammer
- Deaths: 1
- Victim: Karel de Leeuw
- Perpetrator: Theodore Landon Streleski
- Motive: Grievance over the denial of his doctorate and his treatment by the mathematics department
- Accused: Theodore Landon Streleski
- Verdict: Guilty
- Convictions: Second-degree murder
- Convicted: Theodore Landon Streleski

On August 18, 1978, American mathematics professor Karel de Leeuw was murdered by Theodore Landon Streleski, a graduate student at Stanford University. De Leeuw, who was Streleski's former faculty advisor, was fatally bludgeoned from behind with a ball-peen hammer while in his office after Streleski was informed that he would not receive a doctorate.

Twelve hours after the murder, Streleski turned himself in to the authorities, initially remaining quiet about his motivations. He later stated he felt the murder was justifiable homicide because de Leeuw had withheld departmental awards from him, demeaned Streleski in front of his peers, and refused his requests for financial support. These claims were refuted by de Leeuw's wife, who criticised the media for uncritically repeating his claims without verifying their veracity. Streleski was a part-time student in his 16th year pursuing his doctorate in the mathematics department, alternating with low-paying jobs to support himself.

Karel de Leeuw had been his advisor for a brief time; at the time of the murder, Streleski's advisor was Halsey Royden, who had told Streleski his work was sufficient to get a doctorate if he wrote his thesis. During the trial, Streleski told the judge that he had been planning the murder for 8 years, and there were a number of faculty on his list; he stated that if he'd been unable to find de Leeuw he would have murdered David Gilbarg.

During his trial Streleski told the court he felt the murder was "logically and morally correct" and "a political statement" about the department's treatment of its graduate students. His lawyer called a psychiatrist who testified Streleski was a "paranoid psychotic" and argued he had diminished capacity. This argument was accepted by the judge and jury and Streleski was convicted of second degree murder with a sentence of eight years, which at the time was the maximum sentence allowed; three months after the conviction, California raised the maximum sentence to 15 years to life. He served seven years in prison at California Medical Facility.

Streleski was eligible for parole on three occasions, but turned it down as the conditions of his parole required him to stay away from Stanford campus and to get psychiatric treatment. Upon his release in 1985, he said, "I have no intention of killing again. On the other hand, I cannot predict the future."

In 1993, Streleski was turned down for a fare box repair position with the San Francisco Municipal Railway after his crime came to light.
