= Petz recovery map =

Quantum analog of Bayes' theorem

In quantum information theory, a mix of quantum mechanics and information theory, the Petz recovery map can be thought of a quantum analog of Bayes' theorem. Proposed by Dénes Petz, the Petz recovery map is a quantum channel associated with a given quantum channel and quantum state. (A quantum channel is a completely positive trace-preserving (CPTP) map.) This recovery map is designed in a manner that, when applied to an output state resulting from the given quantum channel acting on an input state, it enables the inference of the original input state. In essence, the Petz recovery map serves as a tool for reconstructing information about the initial quantum state from its transformed counterpart under the influence of the specified quantum channel.

The Petz recovery map finds applications in various domains, including quantum retrodiction, quantum error correction, and entanglement wedge reconstruction for black hole physics.

== Definition ==
Suppose we have a quantum state which is described by a density operator $\sigma$ and a quantum channel $\mathcal{E}$, the Petz recovery map is defined as

$$\mathcal{P}_{\sigma,\mathcal{E}}(\rho)=\sigma^{1/2}\mathcal{E}^{\dagger}(\mathcal{E}(\sigma)^{-1/2}\rho  \mathcal{E}(\sigma)^{-1/2})\sigma^{1/2}.$$

Notice that $\mathcal{E}^{\dagger}$ is the Hilbert-Schmidt adjoint of $\mathcal{E}$. Then, we have that

$$\mathcal{P}_{\sigma,\mathcal{E}} (\mathcal{E}(\sigma))=\sigma.$$

Thus, the Petz recovery map perfectly recovers the state $\sigma$ from the channel output $\mathcal{E}(\sigma).$

The Petz map has been generalized in various ways in the field of quantum information theory.

== Properties of the Petz recovery map ==
A crucial property of the Petz recovery map is its ability to function as a quantum channel in certain cases, making it an essential tool in quantum information theory.

1. The Petz recovery map is a completely positive map, since (i) sandwiching by the positive semi-definite operator $\mathcal{E}(\sigma)^{-1/2}(\cdot) \mathcal{E}(\sigma)^{-1/2}$ is completely positive; (ii) $\mathcal{E}^{\dagger}$ is also completely positive when $\mathcal{E}$ is completely positive; and (iii) sandwiching by the positive semi-definite operator $\sigma^{1/2}(\cdot)\sigma^{1/2}$ is completely positive.
2. It's also clear that $\mathcal{P}_{\sigma,\mathcal{E}}$ is trace non-increasing, since

$$\begin{aligned}
\operatorname{Tr}\left[\mathcal{P}_{\sigma, \mathcal{E}}(X)\right] & =\operatorname{Tr}\left[\sigma^{\frac{1}{2}} \mathcal{E}^{\dagger}\left(\mathcal{E}(\sigma)^{-\frac{1}{2}} X \mathcal{E}(\sigma)^{-\frac{1}{2}}\right) \sigma^{\frac{1}{2}}\right] \\
& =\operatorname{Tr}\left[\sigma \mathcal{E}^{\dagger}\left(\mathcal{E}(\sigma)^{-\frac{1}{2}} X \mathcal{E}(\sigma)^{-\frac{1}{2}}\right)\right] \\
& =\operatorname{Tr}\left[\mathcal{E}(\sigma) \mathcal{E}(\sigma)^{-\frac{1}{2}} X \mathcal{E}(\sigma)^{-\frac{1}{2}}\right] \\
& =\operatorname{Tr}\left[\mathcal{E}(\sigma)^{-\frac{1}{2}} \mathcal{E}(\sigma) \mathcal{E}(\sigma)^{-\frac{1}{2}} X\right] \\
& =\operatorname{Tr}\left[\Pi_{\mathcal{E}(\sigma)} X\right] \\
& \leq \operatorname{Tr}[X]
\end{aligned}$$

From 1 and 2, when $\mathcal{E}(\sigma)$ is invertible, the Petz recovery map $\mathcal{P}_{\sigma,\mathcal{E}}$ is a quantum channel, viz., a CPTP map.
