= Karel deLeeuw =

American mathematician (1930–1978)

- Born: February 20, 1930; Chicago, Illinois, U.S.
- Died: August 18, 1978 (aged 48); Stanford, California, U.S.
- Other name: Karel de Leeuw
- Education: Princeton University; Illinois Institute of Technology
- Known for: Choquet–Bishop–deLeeuw theorem
- Spouse: Sita deLeeuw
- Scientific career
- Fields: Mathematics
- Workplaces: Stanford University
- Doctoral advisor: Emil Artin
- Doctoral students: Haskell P. Rosenthal; Alan H. Schoenfeld

Karel deLeeuw, or de Leeuw (February 20, 1930 – August 18, 1978), was an American mathematician and academic who served as a mathematics professor at Stanford University, specializing in harmonic analysis and functional analysis.

== Life and career ==
Born in Chicago, Illinois, he attended the Illinois Institute of Technology and the University of Chicago, earning a B.S. degree in 1950. He stayed at Chicago to earn an M.S. degree in mathematics in 1951, then went to Princeton University, where he obtained a Ph.D. degree in 1954. His thesis, titled "The relative cohomology structure of formations", was written under the direction of Emil Artin.

After first teaching mathematics at Dartmouth College and the University of Wisconsin–Madison, he joined the Stanford University faculty in 1957, becoming a full professor in 1966. During sabbaticals and leaves he also spent time at the Institute for Advanced Study and at Churchill College, Cambridge (where he was a Fulbright Fellow). He was also a Member-at-Large of the Council of the American Mathematical Society.

== Death and legacy ==
DeLeeuw was murdered by Theodore Streleski, a Stanford doctoral student for 19 years, whom he advised. DeLeeuw's widow Sita deLeeuw was critical of media coverage of the crime, saying, "The media, in their eagerness to give Streleski a forum, become themselves accomplices in the murder—giving Streleski what he wanted in the first place."

A memorial lecture series was established in 1978 by the Stanford Department of Mathematics to honor deLeeuw's memory.

== Selected publications ==
- deLeeuw, Karel (1966). "Calculus" (Document). Harcourt, Brace.
- Rudin, Walter; de Leeuw, Karel (1958). "Extreme points and extremum problems in H_{1}". Pacific Journal of Mathematics. 8 (3): 467–485. doi:10.2140/pjm.1958.8.467.
- de Leeuw, Karel (1965). "On L_{p} multipliers". Annals of Mathematics. Second Series. 81 (2). The Annals of Mathematics, Vol. 81, No. 2: 364–379. doi:10.2307/1970621. JSTOR 1970621.
- de Leeuw, Karel (1975). "An harmonic analysis for operators. I. Formal properties". Illinois J. Math. 19 (4): 593–606. doi:10.1215/ijm/1256050668. ISSN 0019-2082.
- de Leeuw, Karel (1977). "An harmonic analysis for operators. II. Operators on Hilbert space and analytic operators". Illinois J. Math. 21 (1): 164–175. doi:10.1215/ijm/1256049511. ISSN 0019-2082.
- de Leeuw, Karel; Yitzhak Katznelson; Jean-Pierre Kahane (1977). "Sur les coefficients de Fourier des fonctions continues". Comptes Rendus de l'Académie des Sciences, Série A et B. 285 (16): A1001–A1003. ISSN 0997-4482.
