= Typical subspace =

Term in quantum information theory

In quantum information theory, the idea of a typical subspace plays an important role in the proofs of many coding theorems (the most prominent example being Schumacher compression). Its role is analogous to that of the typical set in classical information theory.

== Unconditional quantum typicality ==
Consider a density operator $\rho$ with the following spectral decomposition:

$$\rho=\sum_{x}p_{X}(  x)  \vert x\rangle \langle
x\vert .$$

The weakly typical subspace is defined as the span of all vectors such that the sample entropy $\overline{H}( x^{n})$ of their classical label is close to the true entropy $H( X)$ of the distribution $p_{X}( x)$:

$$T_{\delta}^{X^{n}}\equiv\text{span}\left\{  \left\vert x^{n}\right\rangle
:\left\vert \overline{H}(  x^{n})  -H(  X)  \right\vert
\leq\delta\right\}  ,$$

where

$$\overline{H}(  x^{n})     \equiv-\frac{1}{n}\log(  p_{X^{n}
}(  x^{n})  )  ,$$
$$H(  X)     \equiv-\sum_{x}p_{X}(  x)  \log p_{X}(
x)  .$$

The projector $\Pi_{\rho,\delta}^{n}$ onto the typical subspace of $\rho$ is defined as

$$\Pi_{\rho,\delta}^{n}\equiv\sum_{x^{n}\in T_{\delta}^{X^{n}}}\vert
x^{n}\rangle \langle x^{n}\vert ,$$

where we have "overloaded" the symbol $T_{\delta}^{X^{n}}$ to refer also to the set of $\delta$-typical sequences:

$$T_{\delta}^{X^{n}}\equiv\left\{  x^{n}:\left\vert \overline{H}\left(
x^{n}\right)  -H(  X)  \right\vert \leq\delta\right\}  .$$

The three important properties of the typical projector are as follows:

$$\text{Tr}\left\{  \Pi_{\rho,\delta}^{n}\rho^{\otimes n}\right\}
\geq1-\epsilon,$$
$$\text{Tr}\left\{  \Pi_{\rho,\delta}^{n}\right\}     \leq2^{n\left[  H\left(
X\right)  +\delta\right]  },$$
$$2^{-n\left[  H(  X)  +\delta\right]  }\Pi_{\rho,\delta}^{n}
\leq\Pi_{\rho,\delta}^{n}\rho^{\otimes n}\Pi_{\rho,\delta}^{n}\leq2^{-n\left[
H(  X)  -\delta\right]  }\Pi_{\rho,\delta}^{n},$$

where the first property holds for arbitrary $\epsilon,\delta>0$ and sufficiently large $n$.

== Conditional quantum typicality ==
Consider an ensemble $\left\{ p_{X}( x) ,\rho_{x}\right\} _{x\in\mathcal{X}}$ of states. Suppose that each state $\rho_{x}$ has the following spectral decomposition:

$$\rho_{x}=\sum_{y}p_{Y|X}(  y|x)  \vert y_{x}\rangle
\langle y_{x}\vert .$$

Consider a density operator $\rho_{x^{n}}$ which is conditional on a classical sequence $x^{n}\equiv x_{1}\cdots x_{n}$:

$$\rho_{x^{n}}\equiv\rho_{x_{1}}\otimes\cdots\otimes\rho_{x_{n}}.$$

We define the weak conditionally typical subspace as the span of vectors (conditional on the sequence $x^{n}$) such that the sample conditional entropy $\overline{H}( y^{n}|x^{n})$ of their classical labels is close to the true conditional entropy $H( Y|X)$ of the distribution $p_{Y|X}( y|x) p_{X}( x)$:

$$T_{\delta}^{Y^{n}|x^{n}}\equiv\text{span}\left\{  \left\vert y_{x^{n}}
^{n}\right\rangle :\left\vert \overline{H}(  y^{n}|x^{n})
-H(  Y|X)  \right\vert \leq\delta\right\}  ,$$

where

$$\overline{H}(  y^{n}|x^{n})     \equiv-\frac{1}{n}\log\left(
p_{Y^{n}|X^{n}}(  y^{n}|x^{n})  \right)  ,$$
$$H(  Y|X)     \equiv-\sum_{x}p_{X}(  x)  \sum_{y}
p_{Y|X}(  y|x)  \log p_{Y|X}(  y|x)  .$$

The projector $\Pi_{\rho_{x^{n}},\delta}$ onto the weak conditionally typical subspace of $\rho_{x^{n}}$ is as follows:

$$\Pi_{\rho_{x^{n}},\delta}\equiv\sum_{y^{n}\in T_{\delta}^{Y^{n}|x^{n}}
}\vert y_{x^{n}}^{n}\rangle \langle y_{x^{n}}^{n}\vert ,$$

where we have again overloaded the symbol $T_{\delta}^{Y^{n}|x^{n}}$ to refer to the set of weak conditionally typical sequences:

$$T_{\delta}^{Y^{n}|x^{n}}\equiv\left\{  y^{n}:\left\vert \overline{H}\left(
y^{n}|x^{n}\right)  -H(  Y|X)  \right\vert \leq\delta\right\}  .$$

The three important properties of the weak conditionally typical projector are as follows:

$$\mathbb{E}_{X^{n}}\left\{  \text{Tr}\left\{  \Pi_{\rho_{X^{n}},\delta}
\rho_{X^{n}}\right\}  \right\}     \geq1-\epsilon,$$
$$\text{Tr}\left\{  \Pi_{\rho_{x^{n}},\delta}\right\}    \leq2^{n\left[
H(  Y|X)  +\delta\right]  },$$
$$2^{-n\left[  H(  Y|X)  +\delta\right]  }\ \Pi_{\rho_{x^{n}}
,\delta}   \leq\Pi_{\rho_{x^{n}},\delta}\ \rho_{x^{n}}\ \Pi_{\rho_{x^{n}
},\delta} \leq2^{-n\left[  H(  Y|X)  -\delta\right]  }\ \Pi
_{\rho_{x^{n}},\delta},$$

where the first property holds for arbitrary $\epsilon,\delta>0$ and sufficiently large $n$, and the expectation is with respect to the distribution $p_{X^{n}}( x^{n})$.

== See also ==
- Classical capacity
- Quantum information theory
