= Quantum feedback =

Quantum feedback or quantum feedback control is a class of methods to prepare and manipulate a quantum system in which that system's quantum state or trajectory is used to evolve the system towards some desired outcome. Just as in the classical case, feedback occurs when outputs from the system are used as inputs that control the dynamics (e.g. by controlling the Hamiltonian of the system). The feedback signal is typically filtered or processed in a classical way, which is often described as measurement based feedback. However, quantum feedback also allows the possibility of maintaining the quantum coherence of the output as the signal is processed (via unitary evolution), which has no classical analogue.

A feedback loop where all outputs of a process are available as causal inputs to that process

== Measurement based feedback ==
In the closed loop quantum control, the feedback may be entirely dynamical (that is, the plant and controller form a single dynamical system and the controller with the two influencing each other through direct interaction). This is named Coherent Control. Alternatively, the feedback may be entirely information theoretic insofar as the controller gains information about the plant due to measurement of the plant. This is measurement-based control.

== Coherent feedback ==
Unlike measurement based feedback, where the quantum state is measured (causing it to collapse) and control is conditioned on the classical measurement outcome, coherent feedback maintains the full quantum state and implements deterministic, non-destructive operations on the state, using fully quantum devices.

One example is a mirror, reflecting photons (the quantum states) back to the emitter.
