= Open Systems & Information Dynamics =

- Discipline: Mathematics
- Language: English
- Edited by: M. Ohya

Publication details
- Publisher: World Scientific (Singapore)

Standard abbreviations
- ISO 4: Open Syst. Inf. Dyn.

Indexing
- ISSN: 1230-1612 (print); 1793-7191 (web)

Links
- Journal homepage

Open Systems & Information Dynamics (OSID) is a journal published by World Scientific. It covers interdisciplinary research in mathematics, physics, engineering and life sciences based upon the fields of information processing, storage and transmission, in both quantum and classical settings, with a theoretical focus. Topics include quantum information theory, open systems, decoherence, complexity theory of classical and quantum systems and other models of information processing.

== Abstracting and indexing ==
The journal is abstracted and indexed in:

- COMPUMATH Citation Index
- Current Contents/Engineering, Computing and Technology
- Current Contents/Physical, Chemical and Earth Sciences
- Inspec
- ISI Alerting Services
- MATH
- Science Citation Index Expanded (also known as SciSearch)
- Statistical Theory and Method Abstracts
- Zentralblatt MATH
