= Quantum information science =

Interdisciplinary theory behind quantum computing

Quantum information science is an interdisciplinary field that combines the principles of quantum mechanics, information theory, and computer science to explore how quantum phenomena can be harnessed for the processing, analysis, and transmission of information. Quantum information science covers both theoretical and experimental aspects of quantum physics, including the limits of what can be achieved with quantum information. The term quantum information theory is sometimes used, but it refers to the theoretical aspects of information processing and does not include experimental research.

At its core, quantum information science explores how information behaves when stored and manipulated using quantum systems. Unlike classical information, which is encoded in bits that can only be 0 or 1, quantum information uses quantum bits or qubits that can exist simultaneously in multiple states because of superposition. Additionally, entanglement—a uniquely quantum linkage between particles—enables correlations that have no classical counterpart.

== Scientific and engineering studies ==
Quantum information science is inherently interdisciplinary, bringing together physics, computer science, mathematics, and engineering. It involves developing theoretical frameworks, designing quantum algorithms, constructing quantum hardware, and implementing quantum communication protocols.

Quantum teleportation, entanglement and the manufacturing of quantum computers depend on a comprehensive understanding of quantum physics and engineering. Google and IBM, among others, have invested significantly in quantum computer hardware research, leading to significant progress in manufacturing quantum computers since the 2010s. Currently, it is possible to build a quantum computer with over 100 qubits, but the error rates are high due to several factors including decoherence, the lack of suitable hardware and materials for quantum computer manufacturing, which make it difficult to create a scalable quantum computer.

Quantum cryptography devices are now available for commercial use. The one time pad, a cipher used by spies during the Cold War, uses a sequence of random keys for encryption. These keys can be securely exchanged using quantum entangled particle pairs, as the principles of the no-cloning theorem and wave function collapse ensure the secure exchange of the random keys. The development of devices that can transmit quantum entangled particles is a significant scientific and engineering goal.

Qiskit, Cirq and Q Sharp are popular quantum programming languages. Additional programming languages for quantum computers are needed, as well as a larger community of competent quantum programmers. To this end, additional learning resources are needed, since there are many fundamental differences in quantum programming which limits the number of skills that can be carried over from traditional programming. OpenQASM (Open Quantum Assembly Language) is a machine-independent imperative programming language designed to describe quantum circuits. It is based on the quantum circuit model and represents quantum programs as ordered sequences of parameterized operations, including gates, measurements, resets, and real-time classical computations. Beyond implementing quantum algorithms, OpenQASM also enables the specification of circuits for tasks such as characterization, validation, and debugging of quantum processors.

== Related mathematical subjects ==
Quantum algorithms and quantum complexity theory are two of the subjects in algorithms and computational complexity theory. In 1994, mathematician Peter Shor introduced a quantum algorithm for prime factorization that, with a quantum computer containing 4,000 logical qubits, could potentially break widely used ciphers like RSA and ECC, posing a major security threat. This led to increased investment in quantum computing research and the development of post-quantum cryptography to prepare for the fault-tolerant quantum computing (FTQC) era.

== See also ==
- Glossary of quantum computing
- Information theory
- Quantum mechanics
- Quantum computing
- Quantum error correction
- Quantum cryptography and its generalization, quantum communication
- Quantum communication complexity
- Quantum entanglement, as seen from an information-theoretic point of view
- Quantum dense coding
- Quantum teleportation
- Entanglement-assisted classical capacity
- No-communication theorem
- Quantum capacity
- Quantum communication channel
- Quantum decision tree complexity
- Timeline of quantum computing and communication
- Petz recovery map
