= Mark Wilde =

Mark McMahon Wilde
- Born: Metairie, Louisiana, US
- Education: University of Southern California, Tulane University, Texas A&M University
- Scientific career
- Fields: quantum information, quantum computing, quantum communication, mathematical physics
- Workplaces: Cornell University, Louisiana State University, McGill University
- Doctoral advisor: Todd Brun
- Other academic advisors: Patrick Hayden

Mark McMahon Wilde is an American quantum information scientist. He is a professor in the School of Electrical and Computer Engineering at Cornell University, and he is also a Fields Member in the School of Applied and Engineering Physics and the Department of Computer Science at Cornell.

Wilde's research spans quantum information theory (including communication trade-offs, quantum rate-distortion), network quantum information, quantum error correction, quantum optical communication, quantum computational complexity, and quantum entropy inequalities. His research results on quantum entropy inequalities, time travel and quantum cloning, trade-offs in quantum communication, and quantum entanglement measures have been communicated in popular science media.

He has written or coauthored two textbooks on quantum information theory. The first textbook utilizes the von Neumann entropy and its variants and the notion of typical subspace to present the capacities of quantum communication channels. The second textbook utilizes the Renyi entropy and its variants, the hypothesis testing relative entropy, and the smooth max-relative entropy to present the capacities of quantum communication channels. It also has a part dedicated to foundational concepts in quantum information and entanglement theory and another part to feedback-assisted capacities, representing more recent developments from 2013.

== Education ==
Wilde graduated from Jesuit High School in New Orleans, Louisiana in 1998. He received his bachelor's degree in computer engineering from Texas A&M University in 2002, with support from the Thomas Barton Scholarship. He received his Master's degree in electrical engineering from Tulane University in 2004. He received his Ph.D. in electrical engineering from University of Southern California in 2008, under the supervision of Todd Brun and with support from a School of Engineering Fellowship. His Ph.D. thesis was entitled "Quantum Coding with Entanglement" and contributed to the theory of entanglement-assisted quantum error correction. During this time, he also received the Best Teaching Assistant Award from the Department of Electrical Engineering at USC. After his Ph.D. studies, he conducted postdoctoral work in the School of Computer Science at McGill University from 2009–2013 under the supervision of Patrick Hayden, focusing on the topics of quantum information theory, quantum error correction, and quantum computational complexity.

== Career ==
During the summer of 2013, he was a visiting scholar at Raytheon BBN Technologies and the Research Laboratory of Electronics at the Massachusetts Institute of Technology.

In August 2013, he became an assistant professor in the Department of Physics and Astronomy and the Center for Computation and Technology at Louisiana State University (LSU). In August 2018, he was promoted to associate professor with tenure. He is also affiliated with the Hearne Institute for Theoretical Physics at LSU.

From January 2020 until December 2020, he was a visiting professor at the Stanford Institute for Theoretical Physics (on sabbatical leave from LSU).

In July 2022, he became Associate Professor in the School of Electrical and Computer Engineering at Cornell University. In July 2026, he was promoted to Full Professor.

He was associate editor for Quantum Information Theory for IEEE Transactions on Information Theory from May 2015 to December 2021 and for New Journal of Physics from January 2018 until January 2022. He has been on the editorial board for Quantum Information Processing since March 2012.

He co-organized the Southwest Quantum Information and Technology Workshop in 2017 and 2018 and the Beyond i.i.d. in Information Theory Conference in 2015, 2016, and 2020. He was the program committee chair for the 2018 Quantum Communication, Measurement, and Computing Conference, the 2017 Conference on Theory of Quantum Computation, Communication, and Cryptography, and the 2023 Asian Quantum Information Science Conference.

Wilde has an Erdős number of 2.

== Honors ==
- Centre de Recherches Mathematiques Thematic Postdoctoral Fellowship (2011–2013)
- Senior Member of the IEEE (2013)
- APS-IUSSTF Professorship Award in Physics (2014)
- National Science Foundation Career Development Award (2014)
- LSU Alumni Association Rising Faculty Research Award (2015)
- LSU College of Science Faculty Research Award (2016)
- AHP-Birkhauser Prize, awarded to "the most remarkable contribution" published in the journal Annales Henri Poincare (2018)
- LSU Rainmaker Mid-Career Scholar Award (Science, Technology, Engineering & Mathematics) (2019)
- Outstanding Referee of American Physical Society (2021)
- IEEE Fellow, "for contributions to the relative-entropy framework and theorems for quantum communications" (2023)
- Dorothy and Fred Chau Award for Excellence in Undergraduate Research Project Supervision (2023–2024)
- James McCormick Family Advising Award for Outstanding Advisors of First-Year Undergraduate Students (2025)
- Cornell Engineering Research Excellence Award (2025)
