= Rodolfo Gambini =

Physicist, professor, writer (born 1946)

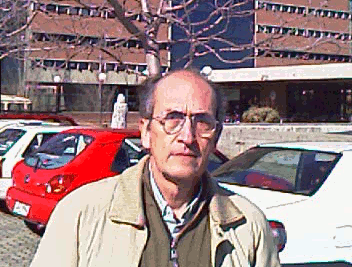
- Rodolfo Gambini in 2008
- Born: Rodolfo Gambini; 11 May 1946 (age 80); Montevideo, Uruguay
- Occupations: Physicist, professor, writer
- Scientific career
- Doctoral advisor: Achilles Papapetrou

Rodolfo Gambini (born 11 May 1946) is a physicist and professor of the Universidad de la Republica in Montevideo, Uruguay and a visiting professor at the Horace Hearne Institute for Theoretical Physics at the Louisiana State University.

He works on loop quantum gravity. He got his PhD in Université de Paris VI working with Achilles Papapetrou. From there he moved to the Universidad Simón Bolívar in Venezuela where he rose through the professorial ranks. It was there that together with fellow physicist Antoni Trías he invented the loop representation for Yang-Mills theories in 1986.

Gambini returned to Uruguay in 1987 after democracy had returned to the country. Gambini has published over 100 scientific articles ranging from philosophy of science and foundations of quantum mechanics to lattice gauge theories to quantum gravity. He was head of the Pedeciba, the main funding agency for basic sciences in Uruguay (2003–2008). He is a fellow of the American Physical Society and of the American Association for Advancement of Science, a member of the Third World Academy of Sciences, the Latin American Academy of Sciences and the Academy of Exact and Natural Sciences of Argentina. He is the 2003 winner of the Third World Academy of Sciences prize in physics and has received numerous distinctions in Uruguay. In particular he was awarded the 2004 Presidential Medal of Science, the Prize to the Intellectual Work in 2011 and made an honorary doctorate of the University of the Republic in 2010.

In recent years he has studied issues in the foundations of quantum mechanics, having developed the Montevideo Interpretation of Quantum Mechanics. He also found the exact solution of the quantum Einstein equations in loop quantum gravity for vacuum spherically symmetric space-times, which resolves the singularity inside black holes.

Gambini is a recipient of the 2003 TWAS Prize.

== Key publications ==
- Loops, Knots, Gauge Theories and Quantum Gravity, with Jorge Pullin
  - Hardcover 1996, ISBN 0-521-47332-2.
  - Paperback 2000, ISBN 0-521-65475-0.
- A First Course in Loop Quantum Gravity, with Jorge Pullin
  - Oxford (2011)
- Gambini, Rodolfo; Trias, Antoni (1986). "Gauge dynamics in the C-representation". Nuclear Physics B. 278 (2): 436–448. Bibcode:1986NuPhB.278..436G. doi:10.1016/0550-3213(86)90221-x.
