= Gaurav Khanna (physicist) =

Indian-American black hole physicist

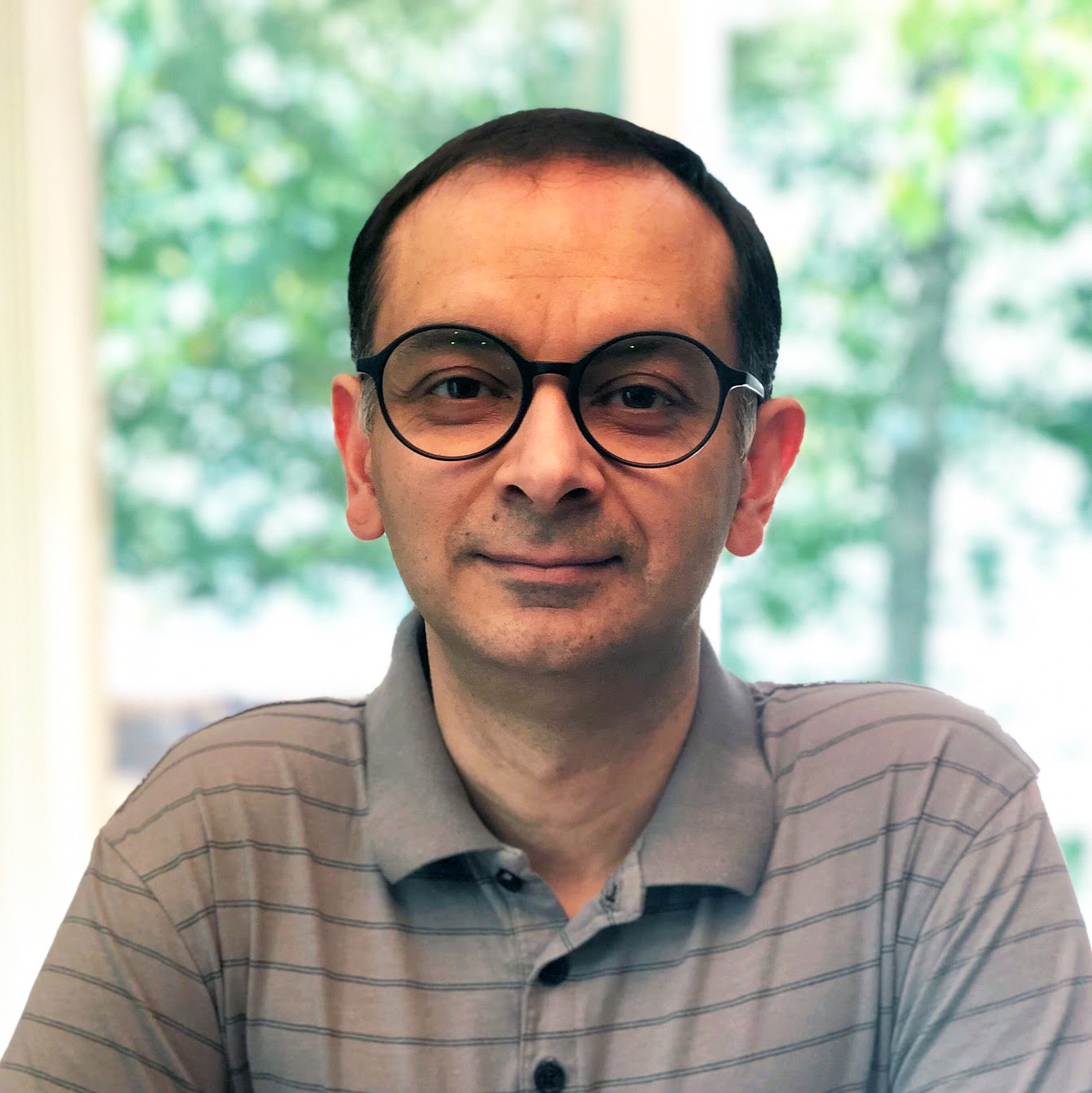
- Born: Chandigarh, India
- Occupations: Black hole physicist, supercomputing innovator, academic and researcher
- Title: Professor/AVP
- Awards: Fellow of the American Physical Society

Academic background
- Education: B. Tech., Electrical Engineering; Ph. D., Physics
- Alma mater: Indian Institute of Technology, Kanpur; Pennsylvania State University
- Thesis: Binary Black Hole Coalescence: The Close Limit (2000)
- Doctoral advisor: Jorge Pullin

Academic work
- Institutions: University of Rhode Island; University of Massachusetts Dartmouth
- Website: https://iacr.uri.edu https://web.uri.edu/gravity

Gaurav Khanna is an Indian-American black hole physicist, supercomputing innovator, academic and researcher. He is a professor of Physics, the founding assistant vice president of Research Computing, and the director for the Institute for AI & Computational Research at University of Rhode Island.

Khanna has authored 100 publications. His work is focused in the areas of gravitational physics, computational physics, black holes, and quantum gravity. He has also made contributions in the area of black hole perturbation theory, loop quantum cosmology, singularities and gravitational wave science. He is the creator of the OpenMacGrid, PlayStation 3 Gravity Grid, and developer of open-source software for scientific computing for the Mac. His work has been featured in newspapers and blogs, including The New York Times, HPCWire, Physics Buzz, The Verge, Forbes, Wired, and Scientific American, He was named a fellow of the American Physical Society in 2021.

Khanna served as a guest editor for a 2018 special issue of IEEE CiSE with a focus on supercomputing.

== Education ==
Khanna studied at Indian Institute of Technology, Kanpur and completed his B. Tech degree in Electrical Engineering in 1995. He then moved to United States and earned his Ph. D. degree in Physics from Pennsylvania State University in 2000.

== Career ==
Beginning in September 2000, he was an assistant professor of Mathematics at Long Island University Southampton. He was then appointed by University of Massachusetts Dartmouth in 2003 as an assistant professor of Physics. He was promoted to associate professor in 2009, and to full professor of Physics in 2015. He is currently a professor of Physics, and AVP of Research Computing at the University of Rhode Island. He is the founding director of the Institute for AI & Computational Research at the university.

His career choices were heavily influenced by his father, Dr. Mohinder P. Khanna, a well-known theoretical particle physicist in Panjab University, India.

== Research ==
Khanna's work is focused in the areas of gravitational physics, computational physics, black holes, and quantum gravity. He has also worked on black hole perturbation theory, loop quantum cosmology, singularities and gravitational wave science.

=== Black hole models related to gravitational waves ===
Khanna is well-known for his research on late-time radiative "tails" in black hole spacetimes, also called "Price tails" named after Richard H. Price. With research collaborators, he was the first to discover the equivalent Price tails formula in the context of (astrophysical, i.e. rotating) Kerr black holes. This formula was later placed on a rigorous mathematical foundation by Aretakis and others.

Khanna has introduced a reduced-order surrogate model called "EMRISur1dq1e4" for gravitational waveforms. He trained this model on the basis of waveform data generated by point-particle black hole perturbation theory (ppBHPT), and evaluated its applicability for large-mass-ratio and comparable mass-ratio binaries finding that it was unreasonably effective. In his paper published in 2016, he solved the inhomogeneous Teukolsky equation, and focused linearized gravitational waves emitted from a plunge into a nearly extremal Kerr black hole.

Khanna has also studied black hole binaries, and demonstrated that coalescence of two black holes generates gravitational waves that provide information regarding the properties of those black holes and their binary configuration. He further described the ringdown form of final coalescence cycles as a superposition of quasinormal modes in context of the merged remnant black hole.

=== Scientific computing ===
In his study regarding scientific computation, Khanna introduced a strategy to scale complex hybrid systems, and also discussed a prototype tool which was built over the theorem prover PVS. He also presented techniques that generate information in context of nonlinear dynamical systems, and discussed their applications in terms of automation for polynomial systems using algorithms from computational algebraic geometry. Furthermore, he suggested the application of formal qualitative abstraction approach in terms of nonlinear systems.

Khanna also studied time-domain methods, and proposed their applications in computing gravitational waveforms and fluxes from extreme mass-ratio inspirals. He further explained the computation of low-m modes using the frequency-domain approach, and computation of high-m modes using the time-domain approach.

In the area of scientific computing, he is perhaps best known for his innovative work on low-cost supercomputing, making it more accessible to lesser-resourced universities and countries.

=== Singularities in classical and quantum black holes ===
While studying singularities, Khanna highlighted the work of Jacobson and Sotiriou in the context of rotating black holes, and then described that if radiative effects can be neglected for the trajectories, that gives rise to naked singularities. He also discussed the significance of the conservative self-force in context of these orbits. He also introduced a class of loop quantizations in terms of anisotropic models including the black hole interior, and studied the refinement process of lattice in context of dynamical changes of the volume.

Khanna published a paper focused on the numerical study of Marolf-Ori singularity inside fast spinning black holes in terms of scalar field or vacuum gravitational perturbations. He also studied how Cauchy horizon singularity inside perturbed Kerr black holes develops an instability that leads to its transformation into a curvature singularity.

=== Extremal black holes and mathematical relativity ===
Khanna conducted a study in 2019 focused the transient scalar hair, and described the behavior of this nearly extreme black hole hair along with its measurement at future null infinity as a transient phenomenon. Furthermore, he studied about the stability of extreme black holes against linearized gravitational perturbations, and argued that the divergence of ψ4 is a consequence of the choice of a fixed tetrad.

His most recent work on gravitational hair in the context of extremal black holes received significant attention in the community and popular media.

== Awards and recognition ==
- 2024 - Rhode Island Monthly Tech10 awardee
- 2021–present - fellow of the American Physical Society (APS): For pioneering work in computational relativity, including innovative supercomputing techniques, computations of gravitational perturbations of black holes, gravitational waveforms from extreme mass-ratio binaries, classical black hole physics, and quantum gravity.
- 2021-2022 - board member at OSHEAN.org
- 2011-2013 - Distinguished Scientist at HPC Research Inc.
- 2008–present - Member of the Foundational Questions Institute
- 1997-1998 - Teaching Award, the Pennsylvania State University
- 1995-2000 - Braddock, Duncan, Roberts, T. Das fellowships, the Pennsylvania State University

== Bibliography ==
- Tiwari, A., & Khanna, G. (2002, March). Series of abstractions for hybrid automata. In International Workshop on Hybrid Systems: Computation and Control (pp. 465–478). Springer, Berlin, Heidelberg.
- Tiwari, A., & Khanna, G. (2004, March). Nonlinear systems: Approximating reach sets. In International Workshop on Hybrid Systems: Computation and Control (pp. 600–614). Springer, Berlin, Heidelberg.
- Bojowald, M., Cartin, D., & Khanna, G. (2007). Lattice refining loop quantum cosmology, anisotropic models, and stability. Physical Review D, 76(6), 064018.
- Barausse, E., Cardoso, V., & Khanna, G. (2010). Test bodies and naked singularities: is the self-force the cosmic censor?. Physical review letters, 105(26), 261102.
- Barausse, E., Cardoso, V., & Khanna, G. (2011). Testing the Cosmic Censorship Conjecture with point particles: the effect of radiation reaction and the self-force. Physical Review D, 84(10), 104006.

A more complete list is available on Khanna's Google Scholar page.

== Personal ==
Khanna has lived in Dartmouth, Massachusetts, and also in Rhode Island, with his wife, April, and daughters, Sarah and Rachel.
