= Immirzi parameter =

Numerical coefficient in loop quantum gravity

The Immirzi parameter (also known as the Barbero–Immirzi parameter) is a numerical coefficient appearing in loop quantum gravity (LQG), a nonperturbative theory of quantum gravity. The Immirzi parameter measures the size of the quantum of area in Planck units. As a result, its value is currently fixed by matching the semiclassical black hole entropy, as calculated by Stephen Hawking, and the counting of microstates in loop quantum gravity.

== The reality conditions ==
The Immirzi parameter arises in the process of expressing a Lorentz connection with noncompact group SO(3,1) in terms of a complex connection with values in a compact group of rotations, either SO(3) or its double cover SU(2). Although named after Giorgio Immirzi, the possibility of including this parameter was first pointed out by Fernando Barbero. The significance of this parameter remained obscure until the spectrum of the area operator in LQG was calculated. It turns out that the area spectrum is proportional to the Immirzi parameter.

== Black hole thermodynamics ==
In the 1970s Stephen Hawking, motivated by the analogy between the law of increasing area of black hole event horizons and the second law of thermodynamics, performed a semiclassical calculation showing that black holes are in equilibrium with thermal radiation outside them, and that black hole entropy (that is, the entropy of the black hole itself, not the entropy of the radiation in equilibrium with the black hole, which is infinite) is (in Planck units)

$\, S=A/4\!$

In 1997, Ashtekar, Baez, Corichi and Krasnov quantized the classical phase space of the exterior of a black hole in vacuum General Relativity. They showed that the geometry of spacetime outside a black hole is described by spin networks, some of whose edges puncture the event horizon, contributing area to it, and that the quantum geometry of the horizon can be described by a U(1) Chern–Simons theory. The appearance of the group U(1) is explained by the fact that two-dimensional geometry is described in terms of the rotation group SO(2), which is isomorphic to U(1). The relationship between area and rotations is explained by Girard's theorem relating the area of a spherical triangle to its angular excess.

By counting the number of spin-network states corresponding to an event horizon of area A, the entropy of black holes is seen to be

$\, S=\gamma_0 A/4\gamma.\!$

Here $\gamma$ is the Immirzi parameter and either

$\gamma_0=\ln(2) / \sqrt{3}\pi$

or

$\gamma_0=\ln(3) / \sqrt{8}\pi,$

depending on the gauge group used in loop quantum gravity. So, by choosing the Immirzi parameter to be equal to $\,\gamma_0$, one recovers the Bekenstein–Hawking formula.

This computation appears independent of the kind of black hole, since the given Immirzi parameter is always the same. However, Krzysztof Meissner and Marcin Domagala with Jerzy Lewandowski have corrected the assumption that only the minimal values of the spin contribute. Their result involves the logarithm of a transcendental number instead of the logarithms of integers mentioned above.

The Immirzi parameter appears in the denominator because the entropy counts the number of edges puncturing the event horizon and the Immirzi parameter is proportional to the area contributed by each puncture.

== Immirzi parameter in spin foam theory ==
In late 2006, independent from the definition of isolated horizon theory, Ansari reported that in loop quantum gravity the eigenvalues of the area operator are symmetric by the ladder symmetry. Corresponding to each eigenvalue there are a finite number of degenerate states. One application could be if the classical null character of a horizon is disregarded in the quantum sector, in the lack of energy condition and presence of gravitational propagation the Immirzi parameter tunes to:

$$\ln(3) / \sqrt{8} \pi,$$

by the use of Olaf Dreyer's conjecture for identifying the evaporation of minimal area cell with the corresponding area of the highly damping quanta. This proposes a kinematical picture for defining a quantum horizon via spin foam models, however the dynamics of such a model has not yet been studied.

== Scale-invariant theory ==
For scale-invariant dilatonic theories of gravity with standard model-type matter couplings, Charles Wang and co-workers show that their loop quantization lead to a conformal class of Ashtekar–Barbero connection variables using the Immirzi parameter as a conformal gauge parameter without a preferred value. Accordingly, a different choice of the value for the Immirzi parameter for such a theory merely singles out a conformal frame without changing the physical descriptions.

== Interpretation ==
The parameter may be viewed as a renormalization of Newton's constant. Various speculative proposals to explain this parameter have been suggested: for example, an argument due to Olaf Dreyer based on quasinormal modes.

Another more recent interpretation is that it is the measure of the value of parity violation in quantum gravity, analogous to the theta parameter of QCD, and its positive real value is necessary for the Kodama state of loop quantum gravity. As of today (2004), no alternative calculation of this constant exists. If a second match with experiment or theory (for example, the value of Newton's force at long distance) were found requiring a different value of the Immirzi parameter, it would constitute evidence that loop quantum gravity cannot reproduce the physics of general relativity at long distances. On the other hand, the Immirzi parameter seems to be the only free parameter of vacuum LQG, and once it is fixed by matching one calculation to an "experimental" result, it could in principle be used to predict other experimental results. Unfortunately, no such alternative calculations have been made so far.
