= Gaurav Khanna (disambiguation) =

Gaurav Khanna is an Indian actor

Gaurav Khanna may also refer to:

- Gaurav Khanna (badminton), Indian badminton coach
- Gaurav Khanna (physicist), Indian-American physicist
