= Wireless failover =

Wireless failover is an automated function in telephone networks and computer networks where a standard hardwired connection is switched to a redundant Wireless connection upon failure or irregular closure of a default hardwired connection or component in the network such as a router, server, or computer.

Wireless failover is a business continuity function. That is, it allows businesses to continue operations even in the event of a network failure. In retail, wireless failover is typically used when a standard connection for a point of sale credit card machine fails. In this instance, the wireless failover allows business transactions to continue to be processed, ensuring business continuity.

== Infrastructure ==
Wireless failover solutions are offered in different forms. A radio may be installed into the network. Examples of this may include a 3G or 4G network connection. Additionally, 3G or 4G network cards may be used. Also, a router may be used with an Ethernet connection.
