= Kodama state =

Zero energy solution to the Schrödinger equation in loop quantum gravity

The Kodama state in physics for loop quantum gravity, is a zero energy solution to the Schrödinger equation (a linear partial differential equation that governs the wave function of a quantum-mechanical system).

In 1988, Hideo Kodama wrote down the equations of the Kodama state, but as it described a positive (de Sitter universe) spacetime, which was believed to be inconsistent with observation, it was largely ignored.

In 2002, Lee Smolin suggested that the Kodama state is a ground state which has a good semiclassical limit which reproduces the dynamics of general relativity with a positive (de Sitter) cosmological constant, 4 dimensions, and gravitons. It is an exact solution to ordinary constraints on background independent quantum gravity, providing evidence that loop quantum gravity is indeed a quantum gravity with the correct semiclassical description. In 2003, Edward Witten published a paper in response to Lee Smolin's, arguing that the Kodama state is unphysical, due to an analogy to a state in Chern–Simons theory wave functions, resulting in negative energies. In 2006, Andrew Randono published two papers which address these objections, by generalizing the Kodama state. Randono concluded that the Immirzi parameter, when generalized with a real value, fixed by matching with black hole entropy, describes parity violation in quantum gravity, and is CPT invariant, and is normalizable, and chiral, consistent with known observations of both gravity and quantum field theory. Randono claims that Witten's conclusions rest on the Immirzi parameter taking on an imaginary number, which simplifies the equation. The physical inner product may resemble the MacDowell–Mansouri action formulation of gravity.
