= Black hole ringdown spectroscopy =

Method used to study black holes

Black Hole ringdown spectroscopy is a method that scientists use to study black holes. They use this method by analyzing the gravitational waves that black holes produce after being disturbed; a clear example is when two black holes merge or combine, the final black hole does not immediately settle and is distorted, unstable, and vibrating. As the final black hole settles, it releases a gravitational wave in a pattern called a 'ringdown'. After these compact objects collide, their final product enters a vibrational stage that relaxes toward a stationary state through its ringdown phase.

Simulation of a binary black hole merger. after 2 black holes combine and their product settles, the remnant black hole emits gravitational waves during its ringdown phase.

'Ringdown' comes from the idea where, when you hit a bell, it rings for a short period, vibrates at a certain frequency, and over time it quiets down. A black hole has a similar characteristic, except instead of sound waves, a black hole produces gravitational waves and ripples in spacetime itself. By studying the frequencies and decay rates of these waves, scientists can find the final masses of black holes, their spins, and how they behave the way general relativity predicts. Ringdown radiation has significant scientific potential because predicted quasi-normal mode frequencies and amplitudes can be compared with gravitational-wave data obtained from black-hole collisions.

The method uses 'spectroscopy' because it works similarly to spectroscopy in astronomy, where scientists study light from stars or gases to understand what they are made of. In black hole ringdown spectroscopy, scientists study spectrums of gravitational-wave vibrations from black holes. The frequencies from the black holes act as a mark of the final product of the black hole.

== The ringdown phase ==
Binary black hole mergers are divided into 4 main stages: inspiral, plunge, merger, and ringdown. During the inspiral phase, the 2 black holes will orbit each other, and as they slowly move inward, they lose energy through gravitational waves. In the plunge phase, the 2 black holes will break out of their stable orbits and rapidly fall into each other, leading to the merger phase that combines the 2 black holes into a single distorted object in space, where the ringdown phase then settles as the product of the 2 black holes, leaving the final black hole in place.

According to general relativity, the final product from the black hole merger should eventually become a stationary and compact object with observable parameters such as mass, angular momentum, and charge. Specifically for charges, the charge for black holes is negligible, so mass and spin are only accounted for.

== Quasi-normal modes ==
The vibrations of a ringing black hole are called 'quasi-normal modes'. These are damped oscillations of a black hole after it's been distorted. QNMs are often described as eigenmodes of dampening systems.

They are named "Quasi-normal" because they do not last forever; black holes lose energy over time through gravitational waves, so their oscillation fades. Quasi-normal modes have 2 distinct features, the frequency at which the black hole oscillates, and a dampening time which tells how quickly the oscillation fades.

In its mathematical form:

$$h(t) = \sum Ae^{-t/\tau}\cos(\omega t+\phi)$$

where:

$h(t)$: Gravitational-wave signal

$A$: Strength of the mode

$e^{-t/\tau}$: signal fades

$\tau$: Dampening time

$\omega$: Oscillation frequency

$\phi$: phase

This follows the common description a ring down as the sum of exponential damped sinusoids, specifically, the relevance of gravitational wave signals as damped sinusoids.

GW150914, detected by LIGO in 2015 provided the first detection and observation of gravitational waves from a black hole merger.

== GW150914 and the beginning of observational black hole spectroscopy ==
In February 2016, an article from LIGO was published on Physical Review Letters about the detection of the first gravitational wave 'GW150914'.

This event was important, specifically for ringdown spectroscopy because the late time behavior was expected for a remnant black hole. This was able to give researchers real time gravitational wave data and compare the predictions to general relativity and be able to conclusively investigate the no-hair theorem and potential quasi-normal mode content.
