= Mary Beth Ruskai =

American mathematical physicist

Mary Beth Ruskai (February 26, 1944 – September 27, 2023) was an American mathematical physicist and professor of mathematics with interest in mathematical problems in quantum physics. She was a Fellow of the AAAS, AMS, APS, and AWM.

== Personal life and education ==
Ruskai was the daughter of Michael J. Ruskai and Evelyn M. Ruskai (née Gortz). She had three sisters. She graduated from Notre Dame College in Cleveland, Ohio in 1965 with a BS in chemistry. She simultaneously received her M.A. in mathematics and her Ph.D. in physical chemistry from the University of Wisconsin–Madison in 1969. Her PhD thesis was about the N-Representability Problem.

== Career ==
She was the Battelle postdoctoral fellow in mathematical physics at the Institut de Physique Theorique in Geneva Switzerland from 1969 to 1971. She spent most of her career at the University of Massachusetts Lowell, where she was on the faculty from 1977 until she took early retirement in 2002. From 2003 to 2013 she was based at Tufts University, from 2011 to 2016 she was an associate member of the Institute for Quantum Computing, and from 2016 to 2023 Adjunct Professor at the University of Vermont.

Her visiting positions included appointments at MIT, Bell Labs, the University of Oregon, Rockefeller University, the University of Vienna, the Bunting Institute (later renamed the Radcliffe Institute for Advanced Studies), the Courant Institute of Mathematical Sciences at NYU, Georgia Tech, Technische Universität Berlin, the Dublin Institute of Technology and the Institute for Quantum Computing in Waterloo, Canada. In 1995 she was the Flora Stone Mather Visiting Professor at Case Western Reserve University in her hometown of Cleveland, Ohio. Its predecessor, the Case Institute of Technology did not admit women until after she received her B.S. in 1965.

== Research ==
Ruskai's research focused on mathematics applicable to quantum mechanics. In 1972 she and Elliot Lieb proved the Strong Subadditivity of Quantum Entropy, which was described in 2005 as "the key result on which virtually every nontrivial quantum coding theorem (in quantum information theory) relies". In 1981 she gave the first proof that an atom can have only a maximum number of electrons bound to it regardless of the charge of its nucleus.

== Other activities ==
Ruskai was an organizer of international conferences, especially those with an interdisciplinary focus. Of particular note was her organization of the first US conference on wavelet theory, at which Ingrid Daubechies gave Ten Lectures on Wavelets. Ruskai considered this one of her most important achievements. She was also an organizer of conferences in Quantum Information Theory, including the Fall 2010 program at the Mittag-Leffler Institute, as well as a series of workshops at the Banff International Research Station and the Fields Institute.

Throughout her career, Ruskai was an advocate for women in mathematics and published 15 articles on gender and science.

Based on a bequest from the estate of Ruskai the EDGE Foundation established in 2024 The Mary Beth Ruskai Research Fund for Women to support awardees in their scientific career.
