= Redundancy (information theory) =

Message encoded with more bits than needed

In information theory, redundancy (redundation) measures the fractional difference between the entropy H(X) of an ensemble X, and its maximum possible value $\log(|\mathcal{A}_X|)$. Informally, it is the amount of wasted "space" used to transmit certain data. Data compression is a way to reduce or eliminate unwanted redundancy, while forward error correction is a way of adding desired redundancy for purposes of error detection and correction when communicating over a noisy channel of limited capacity.

== Quantitative definition ==
In describing the redundancy of raw data, the rate of a source of information is the average entropy per symbol. For memoryless sources, this is merely the entropy of each symbol, while, in the most general case of a stochastic process, it is

$$r = \lim_{n \to \infty} \frac{1}{n} H(M_1, M_2, \dots M_n),$$

in the limit, as n goes to infinity, of the joint entropy of the first n symbols divided by n. It is common in information theory to speak of the "rate" or "entropy" of a language. This is appropriate, for example, when the source of information is English prose. The rate of a memoryless source is simply $H(M)$, since by definition there is no interdependence of the successive messages of a memoryless source.

The absolute rate of a language or source is simply

$$R = \log |\mathbb M| ,\,$$

the logarithm of the cardinality of the message space, or alphabet. (This formula is sometimes called the Hartley function.) This is the maximum possible rate of information that can be transmitted with that alphabet. (The logarithm should be taken to a base appropriate for the unit of measurement in use.) The absolute rate is equal to the actual rate if the source is memoryless and has a uniform distribution.

The absolute redundancy can then be defined as

$$D = R - r ,\,$$

the difference between the absolute rate and the rate.

The quantity $\frac D R$ is called the relative redundancy and gives the maximum possible data compression ratio, when expressed as the percentage by which a file size can be decreased. (When expressed as a ratio of original file size to compressed file size, the quantity $R : r$ gives the maximum compression ratio that can be achieved.) Complementary to the concept of relative redundancy is efficiency, defined as $\frac r R ,$ so that $\frac r R + \frac D R = 1$. A memoryless source with a uniform distribution has zero redundancy (and thus 100% efficiency), and cannot be compressed.

== Other notions ==
A measure of redundancy between two variables is the mutual information or a normalized variant. A measure of redundancy among many variables is given by the total correlation.

Redundancy of compressed data refers to the difference between the expected compressed data length of $n$ messages $L(M^n) \,\!$ (or expected data rate $L(M^n)/n \,\!$) and the entropy $nr \,\!$ (or entropy rate $r \,\!$). (Here we assume the data is ergodic and stationary, e.g., a memoryless source.) Although the rate difference $L(M^n)/n-r \,\!$ can be arbitrarily small as $n \,\!$ increased, the actual difference $L(M^n)-nr \,\!$, cannot, although it can be theoretically upper-bounded by 1 in the case of finite-entropy memoryless sources.

Redundancy in an information-theoretic contexts can also refer to the information that is redundant between two mutual informations. For example, given three variables $X_1$, $X_2$, and $Y$, it is known that the joint mutual information can be less than the sum of the marginal mutual informations: $I(X_1,X_2 ; Y) < I(X_1;Y) + I(X_2;Y)$. In this case, at least some of the information about $Y$ disclosed by $X_1$ or $X_2$ is the same. This formulation of redundancy is complementary to the notion of synergy, which occurs when the joint mutual information is greater than the sum of the marginals, indicating the presence of information that is only disclosed by the joint state and not any simpler collection of sources.

=== Group redundancy ===
The above pairwise redundancy measure can be generalized to a set of n variables.

$Redundancy = I(X_1,X_2,...,X_n ; Y) - \left( I(X_1;Y) + I(X_2;Y) + ... I(X_n;Y) \right)$. As the pair-wise measure above, if this value is negative, one says the set of variables is redundant.

== See also ==
- Minimum redundancy coding
  - Huffman encoding
- Data compression
- Hartley function
- Negentropy
- Source coding theorem
- Overcompleteness
