= Olaf Dreyer =

German physicist

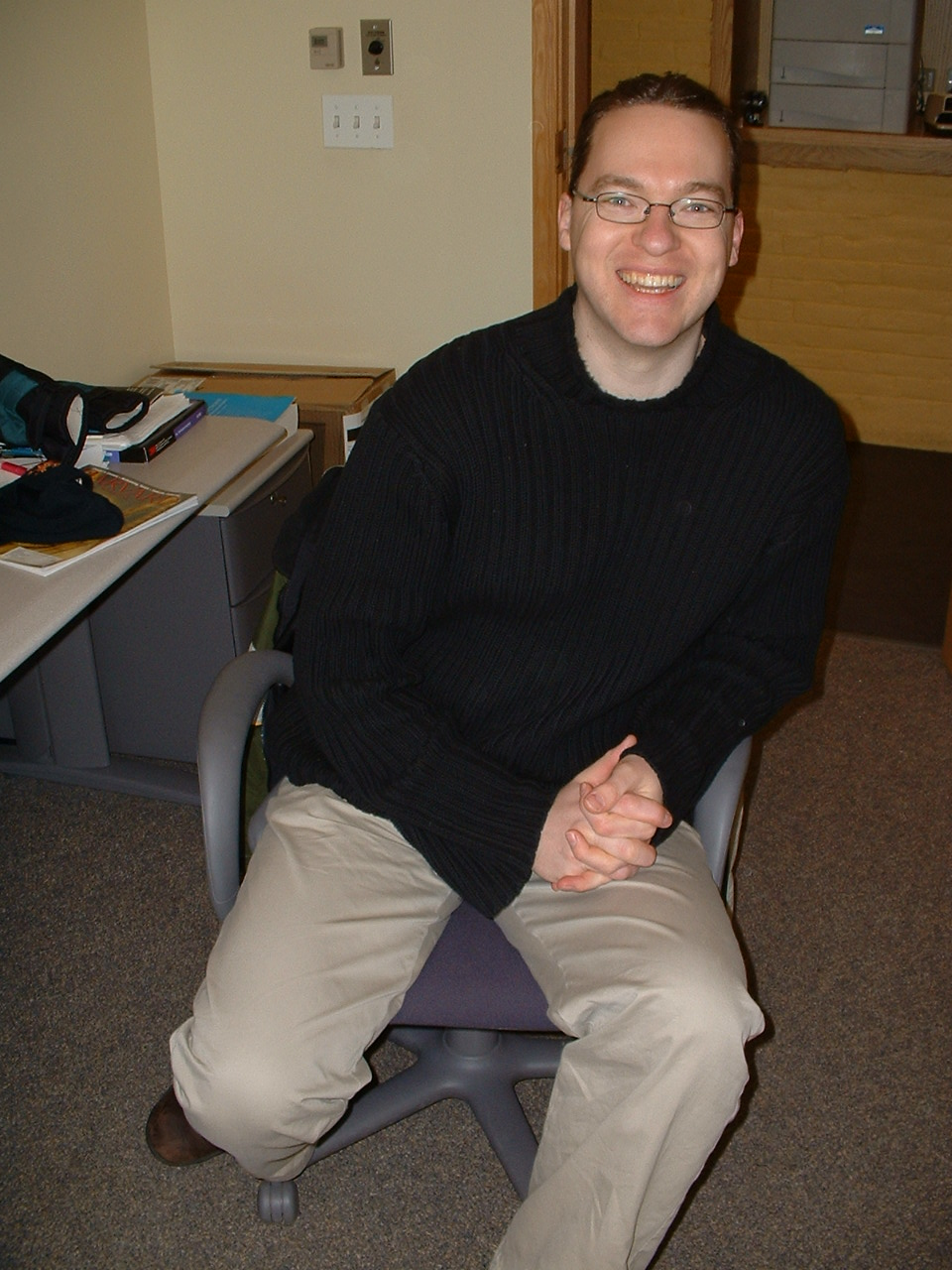
- Dreyer at Harvard University
- Born: 1969 (age 56–57); Hamburg, Germany
- Education: Pennsylvania State University (PhD 2001)
- Known for: "internal relativity"
- Scientific career
- Fields: Theoretical physics, quantum gravity

Olaf Dreyer (born 1969, Hamburg) is a German theoretical physicist whose research interests include quantum gravity and the quantum measurement problem. Dreyer received his Ph.D. in quantum gravity in 2001 from the Pennsylvania State University under the direction of Abhay Ashtekar. Subsequently, he has held a postdoctoral fellowship at the Perimeter Institute for Theoretical Physics in Waterloo, Ontario, a Marie Curie Fellowship at Imperial College, London, and a postdoctoral fellowship at the Center for Theoretical Physics, Massachusetts Institute of Technology.

In 2002 Dreyer proposed a connection between the Barbero-Immirzi parameter in loop quantum gravity and the asymptotic behaviour of black hole quasinormal modes (in numerical general relativity), building on previous insights due to Shahar Hod. Subsequently, Lubos Motl proved that the exact asymptotic behaviour of the quasinormal modes of the Schwarzschild black hole was as predicted numerically.

Dreyer has developed an approach to quantum gravity known as "internal relativity".
