= Min-entropy =

Measure of unpredictability of outcomes

The min-entropy, in information theory, is the smallest of the Rényi family of entropies, corresponding to the most conservative way of measuring the unpredictability of a set of outcomes, as the negative logarithm of the probability of the most likely outcome. The various Rényi entropies are all equal for a uniform distribution, but measure the unpredictability of a nonuniform distribution in different ways. The min-entropy is never greater than the ordinary or Shannon entropy (which measures the average unpredictability of the outcomes) and that in turn is never greater than the Hartley or max-entropy, defined as the logarithm of the number of outcomes with nonzero probability.

As with the classical Shannon entropy and its quantum generalization, the von Neumann entropy, one can define a conditional version of min-entropy. The conditional quantum min-entropy is a one-shot, or conservative, analog of conditional quantum entropy.

To interpret a conditional information measure, suppose Alice and Bob were to share a bipartite quantum state $\rho_{AB}$. Alice has access to system $A$ and Bob to system $B$. The conditional entropy measures the average uncertainty Bob has about Alice's state upon sampling from his own system. The min-entropy can be interpreted as the distance of a state from a maximally entangled state.

This concept is useful in quantum cryptography, in the context of privacy amplification (see for example).

== Definition for classical distributions ==
If $P=(p_1,...,p_n)$ is a classical finite probability distribution, its min-entropy can be defined as
$$H_{\rm min}(\boldsymbol P) = \log\frac{1}{P_{\rm max}},
\qquad P_{\rm max}\equiv \max_i p_i.$$
One way to justify the name of the quantity is to compare it with the more standard definition of entropy, which reads $\textstyle H(\boldsymbol P)=\sum_i p_i\log(1/p_i)$, and can thus be written concisely as the expectation value of $\log (1/p_i)$ over the distribution. If instead of taking the expectation value of this quantity we take its minimum value, we get precisely the above definition of $H_{\rm min}(\boldsymbol P)$.

From an operational perspective, the min-entropy equals the negative logarithm of the probability of successfully guessing the outcome of a random draw from $P$. This is because it is optimal to guess the element with the largest probability and the chance of success equals the probability of that element.

== Definition for quantum states ==
A natural way to generalize "min-entropy" from classical to quantum states is to leverage the simple observation that quantum states define classical probability distributions when measured in some basis. There is however the added difficulty that a single quantum state can result in infinitely many possible probability distributions, depending on how it is measured. A natural path is then, given a quantum state $\rho$, to still define $H_{\rm min}(\rho)$ as $\log(1/P_{\rm max})$, but this time defining $P_{\rm max}$ as the maximum possible probability that can be obtained measuring $\rho$, maximizing over all possible projective measurements. Using this, one gets the operational definition that the min-entropy of $\rho$ equals the negative logarithm of the probability of successfully guessing the outcome of any measurement of $\rho$.

Formally, this leads to the definition
$$H_{\rm min}(\rho) = \max_\Pi \log \frac{1}{\max_i \operatorname{tr}(\Pi_i \rho)}
= - \max_\Pi \log \max_i \operatorname{tr}(\Pi_i \rho),$$
where we are maximizing over the set of all projective measurements $\Pi=(\Pi_i)_i$, $\Pi_i$ represent the measurement outcomes in the POVM formalism, and $\operatorname{tr}(\Pi_i \rho)$ is therefore the probability of observing the $i$-th outcome when the measurement is $\Pi$.

A more concise method to write the double maximization is to observe that any element of any POVM is a Hermitian operator such that $0\le \Pi\le I$, and thus we can equivalently directly maximize over these to get
$$H_{\rm min}(\rho) = -
\max_{0\le \Pi\le I} \log \operatorname{tr}(\Pi \rho).$$
In fact, this maximization can be performed explicitly and the maximum is obtained when $\Pi$ is the projection onto (any of) the largest eigenvalue(s) of $\rho$. We thus get yet another expression for the min-entropy as:
$$H_{\rm min}(\rho) = -\log \|\rho\|_{\rm op},$$
remembering that the operator norm of a Hermitian positive semidefinite operator equals its largest eigenvalue.

== Conditional entropies ==
Let $\rho_{AB}$ be a bipartite density operator on the space $\mathcal{H}_A \otimes \mathcal{H}_B$. The min-entropy of $A$ conditioned on $B$ is defined to be
$$H_{\min}(A|B)_{\rho} \equiv -\inf_{\sigma_B}D_{\max}(\rho_{AB}\|I_A \otimes \sigma_B)$$
where the infimum ranges over all density operators $\sigma_B$ on the space $\mathcal{H}_B$. The measure $D_{\max}$ is the maximum relative entropy defined as
$$D_{\max}(\rho\|\sigma) = \inf_{\lambda}\{\lambda:\rho \leq 2^{\lambda}\sigma\}$$
The smooth min-entropy is defined in terms of the min-entropy.
$$H_{\min}^{\epsilon}(A|B)_{\rho} = \sup_{\rho'} H_{\min}(A|B)_{\rho'}$$
where the sup and inf range over density operators $\rho'_{AB}$ which are $\epsilon$-close to $\rho_{AB}$. This measure of $\epsilon$-close is defined in terms of the purified distance
$$P(\rho,\sigma) = \sqrt{1 - F(\rho,\sigma)^2}$$
where $F(\rho,\sigma)$ is the fidelity measure.

These quantities can be seen as generalizations of the von Neumann entropy. Indeed, the von Neumann entropy can be expressed as
$$S(A|B)_{\rho} = \lim_{\epsilon \to 0}\lim_{n \to \infty} \frac{1}{n} H_{\min}^{\epsilon} (A^n|B^n)_{\rho^{\otimes n}}~.$$
This is called the fully quantum asymptotic equipartition theorem. The smoothed entropies share many interesting properties with the von Neumann entropy. For example, the smooth min-entropy satisfy a data-processing inequality:
$$H_{\min}^{\epsilon}(A|B)_{\rho} \geq H_{\min}^{\epsilon}(A|BC)_{\rho}~.$$

== Operational interpretation of smoothed min-entropy ==
Henceforth, we shall drop the subscript $\rho$ from the min-entropy when it is obvious from the context on what state it is evaluated.

=== Min-entropy as uncertainty about classical information ===
Suppose an agent had access to a quantum system $B$ whose state $\rho_{B}^x$ depends on some classical variable $X$. Furthermore, suppose that each of its elements $x$ is distributed according to some distribution $P_X(x)$. This can be described by the following state over the system $XB$.
$$\rho_{XB} = \sum_x P_X (x) |x\rangle\langle x| \otimes \rho_{B}^x ,$$
where $\{|x\rangle\}$ form an orthonormal basis. We would like to know what the agent can learn about the classical variable $x$. Let $p_g(X|B)$ be the probability that the agent guesses $X$ when using an optimal measurement strategy
$$p_g(X|B) = \sum_x P_X(x) \operatorname{tr}(E_x \rho_B^x) ,$$
where $E_x$ is the POVM that maximizes this expression. It can be shown that this optimum can be expressed in terms of the min-entropy as
$$p_g(X|B) = 2^{-H_{\min}(X|B)}~.$$

If the state $\rho_{XB}$ is a product state i.e. $\rho_{XB} = \sigma_X \otimes \tau_B$ for some density operators $\sigma_X$ and $\tau_B$, then there is no correlation between the systems $X$ and $B$. In this case, it turns out that $2^{-H_{\min}(X|B)} = \max_x P_X(x)~.$

Since the conditional min-entropy is always smaller than the conditional Von Neumann entropy, it follows that
$$p_g(X|B) \geq 2^{-S(A|B)_{\rho}}~.$$

==== Min-entropy as overlap with the maximally entangled state ====
The maximally entangled state $|\phi^+\rangle$ on a bipartite system $\mathcal{H}_A \otimes \mathcal{H}_B$ is defined as
$$|\phi^+\rangle_{AB} = \frac{1}{\sqrt{d}} \sum_{x_A,x_B} |x_A\rangle |x_B\rangle$$
where $\{|x_A\rangle\}$ and $\{|x_B\rangle\}$ form an orthonormal basis for the spaces $A$ and $B$ respectively. For a bipartite quantum state $\rho_{AB}$, we define the maximum overlap with the maximally entangled state as
$$q_{c}(A|B) = d_A \max_{\mathcal{E}} F\left((I_A \otimes \mathcal{E}) \rho_{AB}, |\phi^+\rangle\langle \phi^{+}|\right)^2$$
where the maximum is over all CPTP operations $\mathcal{E}$ and $d_A$ is the dimension of subsystem $A$. This is a measure of how correlated the state $\rho_{AB}$ is. It can be shown that $q_c(A|B) = 2^{-H_{\min}(A|B)}$. If the information contained in $A$ is classical, this reduces to the expression above for the guessing probability.

=== Proof of operational characterization of min-entropy ===
The proof is from a paper by König, Schaffner, Renner in 2008. It involves the machinery of semidefinite programs. Suppose we are given some bipartite density operator $\rho_{AB}$. From the definition of the min-entropy, we have
$$H_{\min}(A|B) = - \inf_{\sigma_B} \inf_\lambda \{ \lambda | \rho_{AB} \leq 2^{\lambda}(I_A \otimes \sigma_B)\}~.$$

This can be re-written as
$$-\log \inf_{\sigma_B} \operatorname{Tr}(\sigma_B)$$
subject to the conditions
$$\begin{align}
\sigma_B &\geq 0, \\
I_A \otimes \sigma_B &\geq \rho_{AB}~.
\end{align}$$

We notice that the infimum is taken over compact sets and hence can be replaced by a minimum. This can then be expressed succinctly as a semidefinite program. Consider the primal problem
$$\begin{cases}
\text{min:}\operatorname{Tr} (\sigma_B) \\
\text{subject to: } I_A \otimes \sigma_B \geq \rho_{AB} \\
\sigma_B \geq 0~.
\end{cases}$$

This primal problem can also be fully specified by the matrices $(\rho_{AB},I_B,\operatorname{Tr}^*)$ where $\operatorname{Tr}^*$ is the adjoint of the partial trace over $A$. The action of $\operatorname{Tr}^*$ on operators on $B$ can be written as
$$\operatorname{Tr}^*(X) = I_A \otimes X~.$$

We can express the dual problem as a maximization over operators $E_{AB}$ on the space $AB$ as
$$\begin{cases}
\text{max:}\operatorname{Tr}(\rho_{AB}E_{AB}) \\
\text{subject to: } \operatorname{Tr}_A(E_{AB}) = I_B \\
E_{AB} \geq 0~.
\end{cases}$$

Using the Choi–Jamiołkowski isomorphism, we can define the channel $\mathcal{E}$ such that
$$d_A I_A \otimes \mathcal{E}^{\dagger}(|\phi^{+}\rangle\langle\phi^{+}|) = E_{AB}$$
where the bell state is defined over the space $AA'$. This means that we can express the objective function of the dual problem as
$$\begin{align}
\langle \rho_{AB}, E_{AB} \rangle
&= d_A \langle \rho_{AB}, I_A \otimes \mathcal{E}^{\dagger} (|\phi^+\rangle\langle \phi^+|) \rangle \\
&= d_A \langle I_A \otimes \mathcal{E}(\rho_{AB}), |\phi^+\rangle\langle \phi^+|) \rangle
\end{align}$$
as desired.

Notice that in the event that the system $A$ is a partly classical state as above, then the quantity that we are after reduces to
$$\max P_X(x) \langle x | \mathcal{E}(\rho_B^x)|x \rangle~.$$
We can interpret $\mathcal{E}$ as a guessing strategy and this then reduces to the interpretation given above where an adversary wants to find the string $x$ given access to quantum information via system $B$.

== See also ==
- von Neumann entropy
- Generalized relative entropy
- Max-entropy
