= Cavity perturbation theory =

In mathematics and electronics, cavity perturbation theory describes methods for derivation of perturbation formulae for performance changes of a cavity resonator.

These performance changes are assumed to be caused by either introduction of a small foreign object into the cavity, or a small deformation of its boundary. Various mathematical methods can be used to study the characteristics of cavities, which are important in the field of microwave systems, and more generally in the field of electro magnetism.

There are many industrial applications for cavity resonators, including microwave ovens, microwave communication systems, and remote imaging systems using electromagnetic waves. How a resonant cavity performs can affect the amount of energy that is required to make it resonate, or the relative stability or instability of the system.

== Introduction ==
When a resonant cavity is perturbed, e.g. by introducing a foreign object with distinct material properties into the cavity or when the shape of the cavity is changed slightly, electromagnetic fields inside the cavity change accordingly. This means that all the resonant modes (i.e. the quasinormal mode) of the unperturbed cavity slightly change. Analytically predicting how the perturbation changes the optical response is a classical problem in electromagnetics, with important implications spanning from the radio-frequency domain to present-day nano-optics. The underlying assumption of cavity perturbation theory is that electromagnetic fields inside the cavity after the change differ by a very small amount from the fields before the change. Then Maxwell's equations for original and perturbed cavities can be used to derive analytical expressions for the resulting resonant frequency shift and linewidth change (or Q factor change) by referring only to the original unperturbed mode (not the perturbed one).

== General theory ==
It is convenient to denote cavity frequencies with a complex number $\tilde\omega=\omega-i\gamma/2$, where $\omega=Re(\tilde\omega)$ is the angular resonant frequency and $\gamma=2Im(\tilde\omega)$ is the inverse of the mode lifetime. Cavity perturbation theory has been initially proposed by Bethe-Schwinger in optics , and Waldron in the radio frequency domain. These initial approaches rely on formulae that consider stored energy

$\frac{\tilde\omega - \tilde\omega_0}{\tilde\omega_0}\thickapprox -\frac{\iiint_{V}\Delta\epsilon |E_0|^2 dv}{\iiint_{V}(\mu_0 |H_0|^2+\epsilon |E_0|^2)dv}\,$	1

where $\tilde\omega$ and $\tilde\omega_0$ are the complex frequencies of the perturbed and unperturbed cavity modes, and $H_0$ and $E_0$ are the electromagnetic fields of the unperturbed mode (permeability change is not considered for simplicity). Expression (1) relies on stored energy considerations. The latter are intuitive since common sense dictates that the maximum change in resonant frequency occurs when the perturbation is placed at the intensity maximum of the cavity mode. However energy consideration in electromagnetism is only valid for Hermitian systems for which energy is conserved. For cavities, energy is conserved only in the limit of very small leakage (infinite Q's), so that Expression (1) is only valid in this limit. For instance, it is apparent that Expression (1) predicts a change of the Q factor ($Im(\tilde\omega-\tilde\omega_0)$) only if $\Delta\epsilon$ is complex, i.e. only if the perturber is absorbent. Clearly this is not the case and it is well known that a dielectric perturbation may either increase or decrease the Q factor.

The problems stems from the fact that a cavity is an open non-Hermitian system with leakage and absorption. The theory of non-Hermitian electromagnetic systems abandons energy, i.e. $|E.E|$ products, and rather focuses on $E.E$ products that are complex quantities, the imaginary part being related to the leakage. To emphasize the difference between the normal modes of Hermitian systems and the resonance modes of leaky systems, the resonance modes are often referred to as quasinormal mode. In this framework, the frequency shift and the Q change are predicted by

$\frac{\tilde\omega - \tilde\omega_0}{\tilde\omega_0}\thickapprox -\frac{\iiint_{V}\Delta\epsilon E_0^2 dv}{\iiint_{V}(\epsilon E_0^2-\mu_0 H_0^2)dv}\,$	2

The accuracy of the seminal equation 2 has been verified in a variety of complicated geometries. For low-Q cavities, such as plasmonic nanoresonators that are used for sensing, equation 2 has been shown to predict both the shift and the broadening of the resonance with a high accuracy, whereas equation 1 is inaccurately predicting both. For high-Q photonic cavities, such as photonic crystal cavities or microrings, experiments have evidenced that equation 2 accurately predicts both the shift and the Q change, whereas equation 1 accurately predicts the shift only.

The following sections are written with $|E.E|$ products; however, they should be understood with the $E.E$ products of quasinormal mode theory.

== Material perturbation ==
Cavity material perturbation

When a material within a cavity is changed (permittivity and/or permeability), a corresponding change in resonant frequency can be approximated as:

$\frac{\omega - \omega_0}{\omega_0}\thickapprox -\frac{\iiint_{V}(\Delta\mu |H_0|^2+\Delta\epsilon |E_0|^2)dv}{\iiint_{V}(\mu |H_0|^2+\epsilon |E_0|^2)dv}\,$	3

where $\omega$ is the angular resonant frequency of the perturbed cavity, $\omega_0$ is the resonant frequency of the original cavity, $E_0$ and $H_0$ represent original electric and magnetic field respectively, $\mu$ and $\epsilon$ are original permeability and permittivity respectively, while $\Delta\mu$ and $\Delta\epsilon$ are changes in original permeability and permittivity introduced by material change.

Expression (3) can be rewritten in terms of stored energies as:

$\frac{\omega - \omega_0}{\omega_0}\thickapprox -\frac{1}{W}\iiint_{V}(\frac{\Delta\epsilon}{\epsilon}\cdot\bar{w_e}+\frac{\Delta\mu}{\mu}\cdot\bar{w_m})dv\,$	4

where W is the total energy stored in the original cavity and $\bar{w_e}$ and $\bar{w_m}$ are electric and magnetic energy densities respectively.

== Shape perturbation ==
Cavity shape perturbation

When a general shape of a resonant cavity is changed, a corresponding change in resonant frequency can be approximated as:

$\frac{\omega - \omega_0}{\omega_0}\thickapprox \frac{\iiint_{\Delta V}(\mu |H_0|^2-\epsilon |E_0|^2)dv}{\iiint_{V}(\mu |H_0|^2+\epsilon |E_0|^2)dv}\,$	5

Expression (5) for change in resonant frequency can additionally be written in terms of time-average stored energies as:

$\frac{\omega - \omega_0}{\omega_0}\thickapprox \frac{\Delta W_m - \Delta W_e}{W_m + W_e}\,$	6

where $\Delta W_m$ and $\Delta W_e$ represent time-average electric and magnetic energies contained in $\Delta V$.

This expression can also be written in terms of energy densities as:

$\frac{\omega - \omega_0}{\omega_0}\thickapprox \frac{(\bar{w_m}-\bar{w_e})\cdot\Delta V}{W}\,$	7

Considerable accuracy improvements of the predictive force of Equation (5) can be gained by incorporating local field corrections, which simply results from the interface conditions for electromagnetic fields that are different for the displacement-field and electric-field vectors at the shape boundaries.

== Applications ==
Microwave measurement techniques based on cavity perturbation theory are generally used to determine the dielectric and magnetic parameters of materials and various circuit components such as dielectric resonators. Since ex-ante knowledge of the resonant frequency, resonant frequency shift and electromagnetic fields is necessary in order to extrapolate material properties, these measurement techniques generally make use of standard resonant cavities where resonant frequencies and electromagnetic fields are well known. Two examples of such standard resonant cavities are rectangular and circular waveguide cavities and coaxial cables resonators. Cavity perturbation measurement techniques for material characterization are used in many fields ranging from physics and material science to medicine and biology.

== Examples ==
=== TE_{10n} rectangular waveguide cavity ===
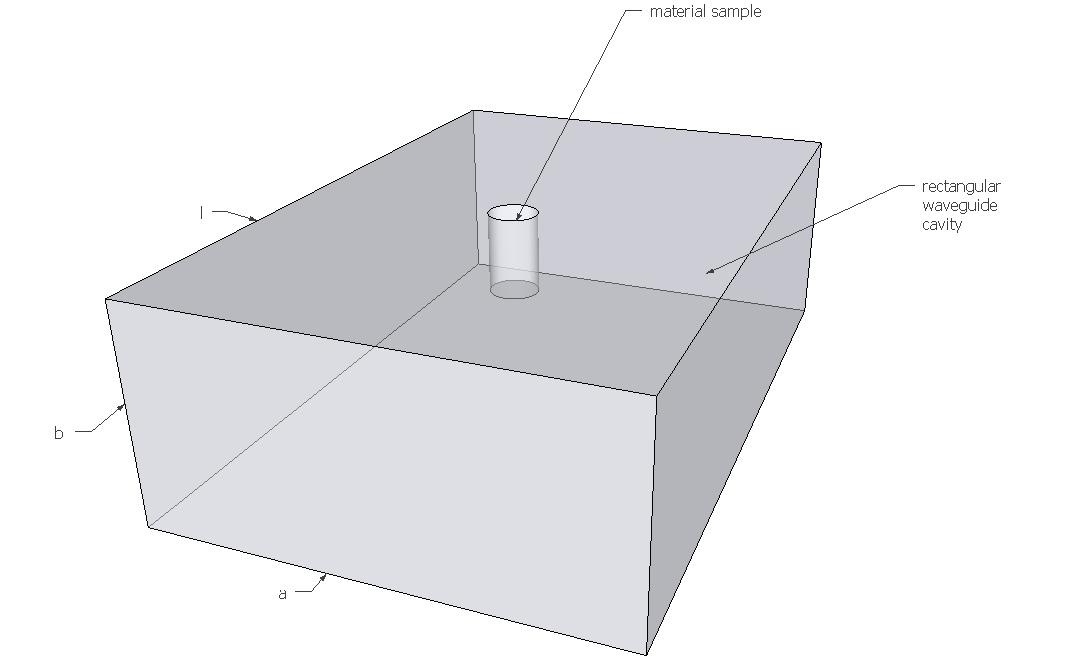
Material sample introduced into rectangular waveguide cavity.

For rectangular waveguide cavity, field distribution of dominant $TE_{10n}$ mode is well known. Ideally, the material to be measured is introduced into the cavity at the position of maximum electric or magnetic field. When the material is introduced at the position of maximum electric field, then the contribution of magnetic field to perturbed frequency shift is very small and can be ignored. In this case, we can use perturbation theory to derive expressions for real and imaginary components of complex material permittivity $\epsilon_r = \epsilon_r'+j\epsilon_r''$ as:

$\epsilon_r'-1=\frac{f_c-f_s}{2f_s}\frac{V_c}{V_s}\,$	8

$\epsilon_r''=\frac{V_c}{4V_s}\frac{Q_c-Q_s}{Q_cQ_s}\,$	9

where $f_c$ and $f_s$ represent resonant frequencies of original cavity and perturbed cavity respectively, $V_c$ and $V_s$ represent volumes of original cavity and material sample respectively, $Q_c$ and $Q_s$ represent quality factors of original and perturbed cavities respectively.

Once the complex permittivity of the material is known, we can easily calculate its effective conductivity $\sigma_e$ and dielectric loss tangent $\tan\delta$ as:

$\sigma_e=\omega\epsilon''=2\pi f\epsilon_0\epsilon_r''\,$	10

$tan \delta=\frac{\epsilon_r''}{\epsilon_r'}\,$	11

where f is the frequency of interest and $\epsilon_0$ is the free space permittivity.

Similarly, if the material is introduced into the cavity at the position of maximum magnetic field, then the contribution of electric field to perturbed frequency shift is very small and can be ignored. In this case, we can use perturbation theory to derive expressions for complex material permeability $\mu_r = \mu_r'+j\mu_r''$ as:

$\mu_r'-1=(\frac{\lambda_g^2+4a^2}{8a^2})(\frac{f_c-f_s}{f_s})(\frac{V_c}{V_s})\,$	12

$\mu_r''=(\frac{\lambda_g^2+4a^2}{16a^2})(\frac{V_c}{V_s})(\frac{Q_c-Q_s}{Q_cQ_s})\,$	13

where $\lambda_g$ is the guide wavelength (calculated as $\lambda_g=\frac{2l}{n}$).
