= Quasinormal mode =

Differential equation solution

Quasinormal modes (QNM) are the solutions of a source-free (usually partial) differential equation describing a dynamical system which does not conserve energy; this can happen if the system incorporates absorbing elements or allows for energy leakage. As such, they differ from normal modes in that the natural frequencies or resonant frequencies characteristic of these solutions are complex, exhibiting a decay of their amplitude in time. Typically, these modes are not orthogonal to each other, a property which lends itself to their name.

== Example ==
A familiar example is the perturbation (gentle tap) of a wine glass with a knife: the glass begins to ring, it rings with a set, or superposition, of its natural frequencies — its modes of sonic energy dissipation. One could call these modes normal if the glass went on ringing forever. Here the amplitude of oscillation decays in time, so we call its modes quasi-normal.

The sound of quasinormal ringing

== Mathematical definition ==
In theoretical physics, a quasinormal mode is a formal solution of linearized differential equations (such as the linearized equations of general relativity constraining perturbations around a black hole solution, or Maxwell's equations for electromagnetic waves) with a complex eigenvalue (frequency).

Quasinormal ringing can be approximated by

$$\psi(t) \approx e^{-\omega^{\prime\prime}t}\cos\omega^{\prime}t$$

where $\psi\left(t\right)$ is the amplitude of oscillation, $\omega^{\prime}$ is the frequency, and $\omega^{\prime\prime}$ is the decay rate. The quasinormal frequency is described by two numbers,

$$\omega = \left(\omega^{\prime} , \omega^{\prime\prime}\right)$$

or, more compactly

$$\psi\left(t\right) \approx \operatorname{Re}(e^{i\omega t})$$

$$\omega =\omega^{\prime} + i\omega^{\prime\prime}$$

Here, $\mathbf{\omega}$ is what is commonly referred to as the quasinormal mode frequency. It is a complex number with two pieces of information: real part is the temporal oscillation; imaginary part is the temporal, exponential decay.

In certain cases the amplitude of the wave decays quickly, to follow the decay for a longer time one may plot $\log\left|\psi(t)\right|$

== Astrophysics ==
A perturbed black hole radiates gravitational waves containing a spectrum of quasinormal modes as it relaxes into its final state. In an astrophysical setting, the most relevant example of this is the merger of two black holes which results in an oscillating remnant that 'rings' down to its final state. These events can be detected with ground-based gravitational-wave detectors.

The frequencies of the quasinormal modes from a Kerr black hole are predicted by the Teukolsky equation. The most important application of QNMs is in testing general relativity, and may improve our understanding of black hole physics. By detecting multiple QNMs in the ringdown, it is possible to check for consistency between their frequencies and the corresponding remnant mass and spin, testing the validity of the no-hair theorem. In analogy with the role of atomic spectroscopy in the development of quantum mechanics, the program for performing these tests is called black hole ringdown spectroscopy.

The angular component of the quasinormal modes of a spinning black hole are the spin-weighted spheroidal harmonics, which form the angular part of the separable solution to the Teukolsky equation. These are generalisations of the spin-weighted spherical harmonics and become equivalent when the spin of the black hole is zero.

There is debate regarding the validity of the linear perturbation theory approximation in describing the ringdown phase of a black hole merger, and which QNMs should be included in models of the ringdown. In particular, the presence of quadratic QNMs, which arise at second order, have been identified in numerical relativity simulations. These have complex frequencies and amplitudes which are related to linear modes. The angular components are related to combinations of the spin-weighted spheroidal harmonics in a non-trivial way, and can be determined numerically from simulation data.

Recently, the properties of quasinormal modes have been tested in the context of the AdS/CFT correspondence. Also, the asymptotic behavior of quasinormal modes was proposed to be related to the Immirzi parameter in loop quantum gravity, but convincing arguments have not been found yet.

== Electromagnetism and photonics ==
Quasinormal modes are a useful tool to describe interaction of light with micro/nano resonators for electromagnetic waves. There are essentially two types of resonators in optics. In the first type, a high-Q factor optical microcavity is achieved with lossless dielectric optical materials, with mode volumes of the order of a cubic wavelength, essentially limited by the diffraction limit. Famous examples of high-Q microcavities are micropillar cavities, microtoroid resonators, photonic-crystal cavities. In the second type of resonators, the characteristic size is well below the diffraction limit, even by 2-3 orders of magnitude. In such small volumes, energies are stored for a small period of time. A plasmonic nanoantenna supporting a localized surface plasmon quasinormal mode essentially behaves as a poor antenna that radiates energy rather than stores it. Thus, as the optical mode becomes deeply sub-wavelength in all three dimensions, independent of its shape, the Q-factor is limited to about 10 or less.

Formally, the quasinormal mode of an open and/or lossy (non-Hermitian) electromagnetic micro or nanoresonators are all found by solving the time-harmonic source-free Maxwell's equations with a complex frequency, the real part being the resonance frequency and the imaginary part the damping rate. The damping is due to energy losses via leakage (the resonator is coupled to the open space surrounding it) and/or material absorption.

Early formulations of QNM theory for electromagnetic systems can be found in and was named singularity expansion method. More recent progress was made by Muljarov and co-workes where it was named resonant-state expansion. The proper normalisation of the mode, suggested by Sauvan et al., leads to the important concept of mode volume of non-Hermitian (open and/or lossy) systems. The mode volume directly impact the physics of the interaction of light with optical resonance, e.g. the local density of electromagnetic states, Purcell effect, cavity perturbation theory, strong interaction with quantum emitters, superradiance.

Quasinormal-mode solvers for electromagnetic waves exist to efficiently compute and normalize all kinds of modes of plasmonic nanoresonators and photonic microcavities, including direct numerical solvers such as COMSOL Multiphysics or JCMwave or perturbative techniques.

== Biophysics ==
In computational biophysics, quasinormal modes, also called quasiharmonic modes, are derived from diagonalizing the matrix of equal-time correlations of atomic fluctuations.

== See also ==
- Resonance (quantum field theory).
