= Saul Teukolsky =

Astrophysicist (b. 1947)

Saul A. Teukolsky
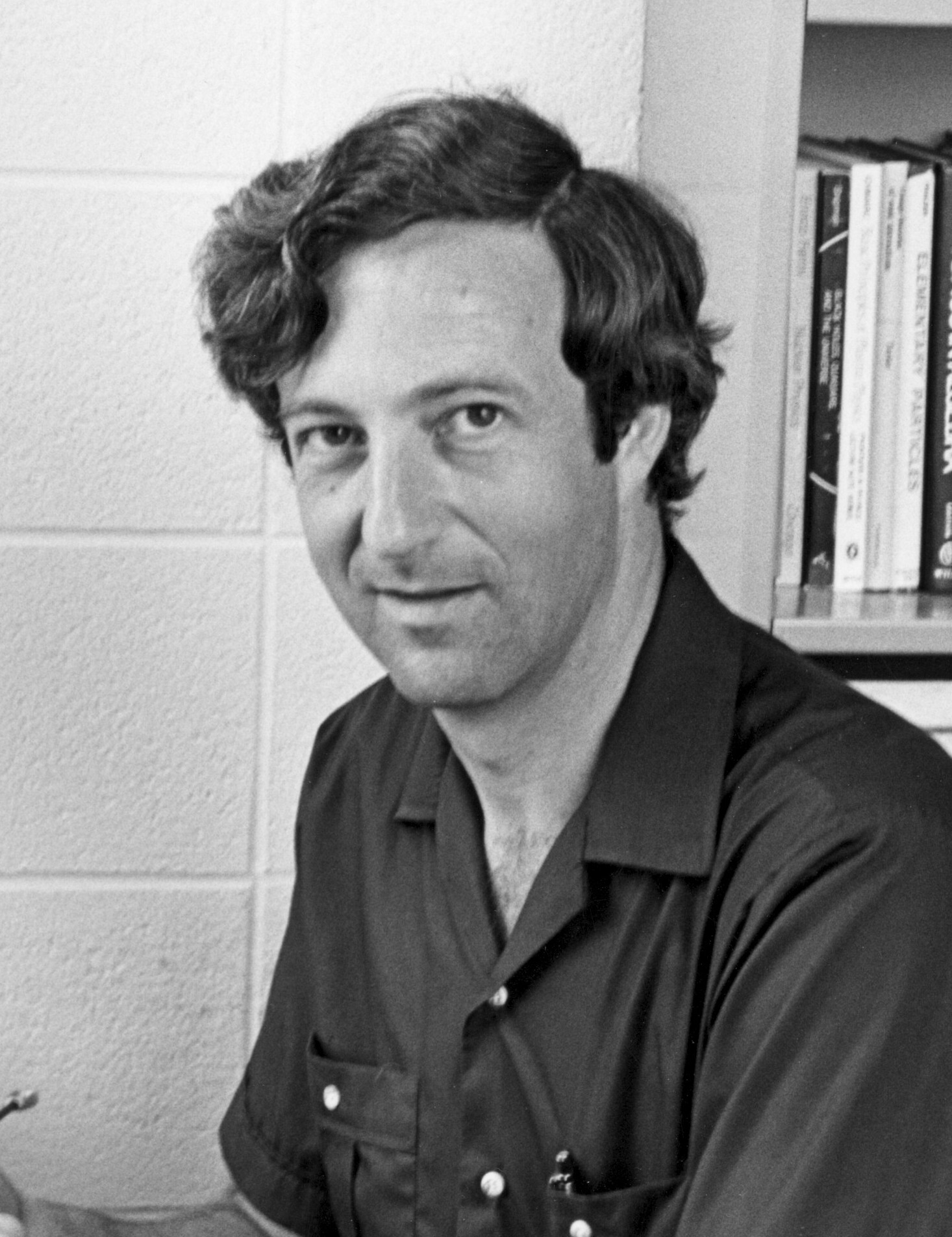
- Teukolsky in 1975
- Born: Saul Arno Teukolsky; August 2, 1947 (age 79); Johannesburg, South Africa
- Education: University of the Witwatersrand; California Institute of Technology; Selborne College
- Known for: Numerical Recipes; Teukolsky Equation
- Scientific career
- Fields: Astrophysics; Numerical relativity
- Workplaces: Cornell University; California Institute of Technology
- Doctoral advisor: Kip Thorne

Saul Arno Teukolsky (born August 2, 1947, Johannesburg, South Africa) is a theoretical astrophysicist and a professor of Physics and Astronomy at Caltech and Cornell University. His major research interests include general relativity, relativistic astrophysics, and computational astrophysics.

== Biography ==
After matriculating from Selborne College (East London, South Africa) in 1964, Teukolsky received a Bachelor of Science in Honors Physics and Honors Applied Mathematics from the University of the Witwatersrand, South Africa in 1970. He went on to be a graduate student under Kip Thorne at Caltech where he received his Ph.D. in 1973.

He joined Cornell University as an Assistant Professor of Physics and Astronomy in 1974 after serving as the Richard Chace Tolman Research Fellow for one year at Caltech. He was promoted to Associate Professor in 1977 and Full Professor in 1983. In 1999 he was named the Hans A. Bethe professor of physics and astrophysics, a position which he still holds. In 2017 he was also appointed as Robinson Professor of Theoretical Astrophysics at Caltech.

Teukolsky is one of the pioneers of numerical relativity: the subject that deals with equations involving general relativity using supercomputers. He is a coauthor of the Numerical Recipes series of books on scientific computing. Today his research group works on numerical relativity calculations to predict signals from the LIGO and LISA experiments.

== Awards ==
- Alfred P. Sloan Fellow, 1973
- John Simon Guggenheim Fellow, 1981
- Forefronts of Large-Scale Computing Award, 1990
- Fellow of the American Physical Society, 1994
- Fellow of the American Astronomical Society.
- Member of the American Academy of Arts and Sciences, 1996
- Member of the National Academy of Sciences, 2003
- Dirac Medal of the ICTP, 2021
- Einstein prize of APS (joint with Clifford Will), 2021.
