= Volume operator =

Operator whose expectation value gives the volume

A quantum field theory of general relativity provides operators that measure the geometry of spacetime. The volume operator $V(R)$ of a region $R$ is defined as the operator that yields the expectation value of a volume measurement of the region $R$, given a state $\psi$ of quantum General Relativity. I.e.$\lang \psi, V(R) \psi \rang$ is the expectation value for the volume of $R$. Loop Quantum Gravity, for example, provides volume operators, area operators and length operators for regions, surfaces and path respectively.

== Sources ==
- Carlo Rovelli and Lee Smolin, "Discreteness of Area and Volume in Quantum Gravity", Nuclear Physics B 442, 593 (1995).
- Abhay Ashtekar and Jerzy Lewandowski, Quantum Theory of Geometry II: Volume operators (1997).
