= Todd Brun =

American engineer and physicist

Todd A. Brun is an American engineer and physicist, currently a professor at University of Southern California. He is a Fellow of the American Physical Society for "contributions to quantum theory and quantum information science, including decoherence and continuous quantum measurement, quantum computation, and quantum error correction." He is a coinventor of the method of entanglement-assisted quantum error correction, which allows for the use of shared entanglement in quantum error correction and for producing a quantum error correction code from an arbitrary classical error correction code.
