= Strong subadditivity of quantum entropy =

Relationship of various quantum subsystems

In quantum information theory, strong subadditivity of quantum entropy (SSA) is the relation among the von Neumann entropies of various quantum subsystems of a larger quantum system consisting of three subsystems (or of one quantum system with three degrees of freedom). It is a basic theorem in modern quantum information theory. It was conjectured by D. W. Robinson and D. Ruelle in 1966 and O. E. Lanford III and D. W. Robinson in 1968 and proved in 1973 by E.H. Lieb and M.B. Ruskai, building on results obtained by Lieb in his proof of the Wigner-Yanase-Dyson conjecture.

The classical version of SSA was long known and appreciated in classical probability theory and information theory. The proof of this relation in the classical case is quite easy, but the quantum case is difficult because of the non-commutativity of the reduced density matrices describing the quantum subsystems.

Some useful references here include:

- "Quantum Computation and Quantum Information"
- "Quantum Entropy and Its Use"
- Trace Inequalities and Quantum Entropy: An Introductory Course

== Definitions ==
We use the following notation throughout the following: A Hilbert space is denoted by $\mathcal{H}$, and $\mathcal{B}(\mathcal{H})$ denotes the bounded linear operators on $\mathcal{H}$. Tensor products are denoted by superscripts, e.g., $\mathcal{H}^{12}=\mathcal{H}^1\otimes \mathcal{H}^2$. The trace is denoted by ${\rm Tr}$.

=== Density matrix ===
A density matrix is a Hermitian, positive semi-definite matrix of trace one. It allows for the description of a quantum system in a mixed state. Density matrices on a tensor product are denoted by superscripts, e.g., $\rho^{12}$ is a density matrix on $\mathcal{H}^{12}$.

=== Entropy ===
The von Neumann quantum entropy of a density matrix $\rho$ is

$$S(\rho):=-{\rm Tr}(\rho\log \rho)$$.

=== Relative entropy ===
Umegaki's quantum relative entropy of two density matrices $\rho$ and $\sigma$ is

$$S(\rho||\sigma)={\rm Tr}(\rho\log\rho-\rho\log\sigma)\geq 0$$.

=== Joint concavity ===
A function $g$ of two variables is said to be jointly concave if for any $0\leq \lambda\leq 1$ the following holds

$$g(\lambda A_1 + (1-\lambda)A_2,\lambda B_1 + (1-\lambda)B_2 ) \geq \lambda g(A_1, B_1) + (1 -\lambda)g(A_2, B_2).$$

== Subadditivity of entropy ==
Ordinary subadditivity concerns only two spaces $\mathcal{H}^{12}$ and a density matrix $\rho^{12}$. It states that

$$S(\rho^{12}) \leq S(\rho^1) +S(\rho^2)$$

This inequality is true, of course, in classical probability theory, but the latter also contains the theorem that the conditional entropies $S(\rho^{12} | \rho^1)= S(\rho^{12} )-S(\rho^1)$ and $S(\rho^{12} | \rho^2)=S(\rho^{12} ) -S(\rho^2)$ are both non-negative. In the quantum case, however, both can be negative, e.g. $S(\rho^{12})$ can be zero while $S(\rho^1) = S(\rho^{2}) >0$. Nevertheless, the subadditivity upper bound on $S(\rho^{12})$ continues to hold. The closest thing one has to $S(\rho^{12})- S(\rho^1)\geq 0$ is the Araki–Lieb triangle inequality

$$S(\rho^{12}) \geq |S(\rho^1) -S(\rho^2)|$$

which is derived in from subadditivity by a mathematical technique known as purification.

== Strong subadditivity (SSA) ==
Suppose that the Hilbert space of the system is a tensor product of three spaces: $\mathcal{H}=\mathcal{H}^1\otimes \mathcal{H}^2\otimes \mathcal{H}^3.$. Physically, these three spaces can be interpreted as the space of three different systems, or else as three parts or three degrees of freedom of one physical system.

Given a density matrix $\rho^{123}$ on $\mathcal{H}$, we define a density matrix $\rho^{12}$ on $\mathcal{H}^1\otimes \mathcal{H}^2$ as a partial trace: $\rho^{12}={\rm Tr}_{\mathcal{H}^3} \rho^{123}$. Similarly, we can define density matrices: $\rho^{23}$, $\rho^{13}$, $\rho^1$, $\rho^2$, $\rho^3$.

=== Statement ===
For any tri-partite state $\rho^{123}$ the following holds

$$S(\rho^{123})+S(\rho^2)\leq S(\rho^{12})+S(\rho^{23})$$,

where $S(\rho^{12})=-{\rm Tr}_{\mathcal{H}^{12}} \rho^{12} \log \rho^{12}$, for example.

Equivalently, the statement can be recast in terms of conditional entropies to show that for tripartite state $\rho^{ABC}$,

$$S(A\mid BC)\leq S(A\mid B)$$.

This can also be restated in terms of quantum mutual information,

$$I(A:BC)\geq I(A:B)$$.

These statements run parallel to classical intuition, except that quantum conditional entropies can be negative, and quantum mutual informations can exceed the classical bound of the marginal entropy.

The strong subadditivity inequality was improved in the following way by Carlen and Lieb

$$S(\rho^{12})+S(\rho^{23})-S(\rho^{123})-S(\rho^2)  \geq 2\max\{S(\rho^1)-S(\rho^{13}),S(\rho^3)-S(\rho^{13}), 0 \}$$,

with the optimal constant $2$.

J. Kiefer proved a peripherally related convexity result in 1959, which is a corollary of an operator Schwarz inequality proved by E.H.Lieb and M.B.Ruskai. However, these results are comparatively simple, and the proofs do not use the results of Lieb's 1973 paper on convex and concave trace functionals. It was this paper that provided the mathematical basis of the proof of SSA by Lieb and Ruskai. The extension from a Hilbert space setting to a von Neumann algebra setting, where states are not given by density matrices, was done by Narnhofer and Thirring .

The theorem can also be obtained by proving numerous equivalent statements, some of which are summarized below.

== Wigner–Yanase–Dyson conjecture ==
E. P. Wigner and M. M. Yanase proposed a different definition of entropy, which was generalized by Freeman Dyson.

=== The Wigner–Yanase–Dyson p-skew information ===
The Wigner–Yanase–Dyson $p$-skew information of a density matrix $\rho$. with respect to an operator $K$ is

$$I_p(\rho, K)=\frac{1}{2}{\rm Tr}[\rho^p, K^*][\rho^{1-p}, K],$$

where $[A,B]=AB-BA$ is a commutator, $K^*$ is the adjoint of $K$ and $0\leq p\leq 1$ is fixed.

=== Concavity of p-skew information ===
It was conjectured by E. P. Wigner and M. M. Yanase in that $p$- skew information is concave as a function of a density matrix $\rho$ for a fixed $0\leq p\leq 1$.

Since the term $-\tfrac{1}{2}{\rm Tr}\rho KK^*$ is concave (it is linear), the conjecture reduces to the problem of concavity of $Tr\rho^p K^*\rho^{1-p}K$. As noted in, this conjecture (for all $0 \leq p \leq 1$) implies SSA, and was proved for $p= \tfrac{1}{2}$ in, and for all $0\leq p \leq 1$ in in the following more general form: The function of two matrix variables

$A, B \mapsto {\rm Tr} A^{r}K^*B^pK$	1

is jointly concave in $A$ and $B,$ when $0\leq r\leq 1$ and $p+r \leq 1$.

This theorem is an essential part of the proof of SSA in.

In their paper E. P. Wigner and M. M. Yanase also conjectured the subadditivity of $p$-skew information for $p=\tfrac{1}{2}$, which was disproved by Hansen by giving a counterexample.

== First two statements equivalent to SSA ==
It was pointed out in that the first statement below is equivalent to SSA and A. Ulhmann in showed the equivalence between the second statement below and SSA.

- $S(\rho^1)+S(\rho^3)-S(\rho^{12})-S(\rho^{23})\leq 0.$ Note that the conditional entropies $S(\rho^{12}|\rho^1)$ and $S(\rho^{23}|\rho^3)$ do not have to be both non-negative.
- The map $\rho^{12}\mapsto S(\rho^1)-S(\rho^{12})$ is convex.

Both of these statements were proved directly in.

== Joint convexity of relative entropy ==
As noted by Lindblad and Uhlmann, if, in equation (1), one takes $K=1$ and $r=1-p, A=\rho$ and $B=\sigma$ and differentiates in $p$ at $p=0$, one obtains the joint convexity of relative entropy: i.e., if $\rho=\sum_k\lambda_k\rho_k$, and $\sigma=\sum_k\lambda_k\sigma_k$, then

$S\Bigl(\sum_k \lambda_k\rho_k||\sum_k\lambda_k \sigma_k \Bigr)\leq \sum_k\lambda_k S(\rho_k||\sigma_k),$	2

where $\lambda_k\geq 0$ with $\sum_k\lambda_k=1$.

== Monotonicity of quantum relative entropy ==
The relative entropy decreases monotonically under completely positive trace preserving (CPTP) operations $\mathcal{N}$ on density matrices,

$S(\mathcal{N}(\rho)\|\mathcal{N}(\sigma))\leq S(\rho\|\sigma)$.

This inequality is called Monotonicity of quantum relative entropy. Owing to the Stinespring factorization theorem, this inequality is a consequence of a particular choice of the CPTP map - a partial trace map described below.

The most important and basic class of CPTP maps is a partial trace operation $T:\mathcal{B}(\mathcal{H}^{12}) \rightarrow \mathcal{B}(\mathcal{H}^{1})$, given by $T=1_{\mathcal{H}^1}\otimes \mathrm{Tr}_{\mathcal{H}^2}$. Then

$S(T\rho||T\sigma)\leq S(\rho||\sigma),$	3

which is called Monotonicity of quantum relative entropy under partial trace.

To see how this follows from the joint convexity of relative entropy, observe that $T$ can be written in Uhlmann's representation as

$$T(\rho^{12} ) = N^{-1} \sum_{j=1}^N (1_{\mathcal{H}^1}\otimes U_j) \rho^{12}(1_{\mathcal{H}^1}\otimes U_j^*),$$

for some finite $N$ and some collection of unitary matrices on $\mathcal{H}^2$ (alternatively, integrate over Haar measure). Since the trace (and hence the relative entropy) is unitarily invariant, inequality (3) now follows from (2). This theorem is due to Lindblad and Uhlmann, whose proof is the one given here.

SSA is obtained from (3) with $\mathcal{H}^1$ replaced by $\mathcal{H}^{12}$ and $\mathcal{H}^2$ replaced $\mathcal{H}^3$. Take $\rho = \rho^{123},$ $\sigma = \rho^1\otimes \rho^{23},$ $T= 1_{\mathcal{H}^{12}}\otimes Tr_{\mathcal{H}^3}$. Then (3) becomes

$$S(\rho^{12}||\rho^1\otimes \rho^2)\leq S(\rho^{123}||\rho^1\otimes\rho^{23}).$$

Therefore,

$$S(\rho^{123}||\rho^1\otimes\rho^{23})- S(\rho^{12}||\rho^1\otimes \rho^2)=S(\rho^{12})+S(\rho^{23})-S(\rho^{123})-S(\rho^2)\geq 0,$$

which is SSA. Thus, the monotonicity of quantum relative entropy (which follows from (1) implies SSA.

== Relationship among inequalities ==
All of the above important inequalities are equivalent to each other, and can also be proved directly. The following are equivalent:

- Monotonicity of quantum relative entropy (MONO);
- Monotonicity of quantum relative entropy under partial trace (MPT);
- Strong subadditivity (SSA);
- Joint convexity of quantum relative entropy (JC);

The following implications show the equivalence between these inequalities.

- MONO $\Rightarrow$ MPT: follows since the MPT is a particular case of MONO;
- MPT $\Rightarrow$ MONO: was shown by Lindblad, using a representation of stochastic maps as a partial trace over an auxiliary system;
- MPT $\Rightarrow$ SSA: follows by taking a particular choice of tri-partite states in MPT, described in the section above, "Monotonicity of quantum relative entropy";
- SSA $\Rightarrow$ MPT: by choosing $\rho_{123}$ to be block diagonal, one can show that SSA implies that the map

$\rho_{12}\mapsto S(\rho_1)-S(\rho_{12})$ is convex. In it was observed that this convexity yields MPT;

- MPT $\Rightarrow$ JC: as it was mentioned above, by choosing $\rho_{12}$ (and similarly, $\sigma_{12}$) to be block diagonal matrix with blocks $\lambda_k\rho_k$ (and $\lambda_k\sigma_k$), the partial trace is a sum over blocks so that $\rho:=\rho_2=\sum_k\lambda_k\rho_k$, so from MPT one can obtain JC;
- JC $\Rightarrow$ SSA: using the 'purification process', Araki and Lieb, observed that one could obtain new useful inequalities from the known ones. By purifying $\rho_{123}$ to $\rho_{1234}$ it can be shown that SSA is equivalent to

$$S(\rho_4)+S(\rho_2)\leq S(\rho_{12})+S(\rho_{14}).$$

Moreover, if $\rho_{124}$ is pure, then $S(\rho_2)=S(\rho_{14})$ and $S(\rho_4)=S(\rho_{12})$, so the equality holds in the above inequality. Since the extreme points of the convex set of density matrices are pure states, SSA follows from JC;

See, for a discussion.

== The case of equality ==
=== Equality in monotonicity of quantum relative entropy inequality ===
In, Dénes Petz showed that the only case of equality in the monotonicity relation is to have a proper "recovery" channel:

For all states $\rho$ and $\sigma$ on a Hilbert space $\mathcal{H}$ and all quantum operators $T: \mathcal{B}(\mathcal{H})\rightarrow \mathcal{B}(\mathcal{K})$,

$$S(T\rho||T\sigma)= S(\rho||\sigma),$$

if and only if there exists a quantum operator $\hat{T}$ such that

$\hat{T}T\sigma=\sigma,$ and $\hat{T}T\rho=\rho.$

Moreover, $\hat{T}$ can be given explicitly by the formula

$$\hat{T}\omega=\sigma^{1/2}T^*\Bigl((T\sigma)^{-1/2}\omega(T\sigma)^{-1/2} \Bigr)\sigma^{1/2},$$

where $T^*$ is the adjoint map of $T$.

D. Petz also gave another condition when the equality holds in Monotonicity of quantum relative entropy: the first statement below. Differentiating it at $t=0$ we have the second condition. Moreover, M.B. Ruskai gave another proof of the second statement.

For all states $\rho$ and $\sigma$ on $\mathcal{H}$ and all quantum operators $T: \mathcal{B}(\mathcal{H})\rightarrow \mathcal{B}(\mathcal{K})$,

$$S(T\rho||T\sigma)= S(\rho||\sigma),$$

if and only if the following equivalent conditions are satisfied:

- $T^*(T(\rho)^{it}T(\sigma)^{it})=\rho^{it}\sigma^{-it}$ for all real $t$.
- $\log\rho-\log\sigma=T^*\Bigl(\log T(\rho)-\log T(\sigma) \Bigr).$

where $T^*$ is the adjoint map of $T$.

=== Equality in strong subadditivity inequality ===
P. Hayden, R. Jozsa, D. Petz and A. Winter described the states for which the equality holds in SSA.

A state $\rho^{ABC}$ on a Hilbert space $\mathcal{H}^A\otimes\mathcal{H}^B\otimes\mathcal{H}^C$ satisfies strong subadditivity with equality if and only if there is a decomposition of second system as

$$\mathcal{H}^B=\bigoplus_j \mathcal{H}^{B^L_j}\otimes \mathcal{H}^{B^R_j}$$

into a direct sum of tensor products, such that

$$\rho^{ABC}=\bigoplus_j q_j\rho^{AB^L_j}\otimes\rho^{B^R_jC},$$

with states $\rho^{AB^L_j}$ on $\mathcal{H}^A\otimes\mathcal{H}^{B^L_j}$ and $\rho^{B^R_jC}$ on $\mathcal{H}^{B^R_j}\otimes\mathcal{H}^C$, and a probability distribution $\{q_j\}$.

== Carlen-Lieb Extension ==
E. H. Lieb and E.A. Carlen have found an explicit error term in the SSA inequality, namely,

$S(\rho^{12})+S(\rho^{23})-S(\rho^{123})-S(\rho^2) \geq 2\max \{0, S(\rho^1)-S(\rho^{13}), S(\rho^3)-S(\rho^{13})\}$

If $S(\rho^1)-S(\rho^{13})\leq 0$ and $S(\rho^3)-S(\rho^{13})\leq 0$, as is always the case for the classical Shannon entropy, this inequality has nothing to say. For the quantum entropy, on the other hand, it is quite possible that the conditional entropies satisfy $-S(\rho^{13}|\rho^1)=S(\rho^1)-S(\rho^{13})>0$ or $-S(\rho^{13}|\rho^3)=S(\rho^3)-S(\rho^{13})>0$ (but never both!). Then, in this "highly quantum" regime, this inequality provides additional information.

The constant 2 is optimal, in the sense that for any constant larger than 2, one can find a state for which the inequality is violated with that constant.

== Operator extension of strong subadditivity ==
In his paper I. Kim studied an operator extension of strong subadditivity, proving the following inequality:

For a tri-partite state (density matrix) $\rho^{123}$ on $\mathcal{H}^1\otimes \mathcal{H}^2\otimes\mathcal{H}^3$,

$$Tr_{12}\Bigl(\rho^{123}(-\log(\rho^{12})-\log(\rho^{23})+\log(\rho^2)+\log(\rho^{123}))\Bigr) \geq 0.$$

The proof of this inequality is based on Effros's theorem, for which particular functions and operators are chosen to derive the inequality above. M. B. Ruskai describes this work in details in and discusses how to prove a large class of new matrix inequalities in the tri-partite and bi-partite cases by taking a partial trace over all but one of the spaces.

== Extensions of strong subadditivity in terms of recoverability ==
A significant strengthening of strong subadditivity was proved in 2014 by Omar Fawzi and Renato Renner, which was subsequently improved by Mark Wilde and coworkers. In 2017, it was shown that the recovery channel can be taken to be the original Petz recovery map. These improvements of strong subadditivity have physical interpretations in terms of recoverability, meaning that if the conditional mutual information $I(A;B|E)=S(AE) + S(BE) - S(E) - S(ABE)$ of a tripartite quantum state $\rho_{ABE}$ is nearly equal to zero, then it is possible to perform a recovery channel $\mathcal{R}_{E\to AE}$ (from system E to AE) such that $\rho_{ABE} \approx \mathcal{R}_{E\to AE}(\rho_{BE})$. These results thus generalize the exact equality conditions mentioned above.

== See also ==
- Von Neumann entropy
- Conditional quantum entropy
- Quantum mutual information
- Kullback–Leibler divergence
