= Teukolsky Equation =

Description of perturbed Kerr black holes

Saul Teukolsky’s major contribution to general relativity was his publication on perturbations of a rotating black hole in the early 1970s. In 1973, Teukolsky derived linear equations describing the scalar, electromagnetic, gravitational, and neutrino field perturbations specifically for the Kerr metric, which depicts an electrically uncharged rotating black hole. Using perturbation theory for this case was more difficult than for the Schwarzschild metric, which lacks rotation. Teukolsky perturbed the Kerr black hole via the Newman-Penrose formalism, and the relevant perturbation equations could be decoupled and separated in terms of ordinary differential equations for the radial and angular coordinates.

The resulting master equation is commonly known as the Teukolsky equation, which was derived in the Boyer–Lindquist coordinates, and can be written in the following form:

$$\begin{aligned}
\left[\frac{\left(r^2+a^2\right)^2}{\Delta}-a^2\sin^2{\theta}\right]\frac{\partial^2\psi}{\partial t^2}+\frac{4Mar}{\Delta}\frac{\partial^2\psi}{\partial t \, \partial\phi}+\left[\frac{a^2}{\Delta}-\frac{1}{\sin^2{\theta}}\right]\frac{\partial^2\psi}{\partial\phi^2} \\[6pt]
-\Delta^{-s}\frac{\partial}{\partial r}\left(\Delta^{s+1}\frac{\partial\psi}{\partial r}\right)-\frac{1}{\sin{\theta}}\frac{\partial}{\partial\theta}\left(\sin{\theta}\frac{\partial\psi}{\partial\theta}\right) \\[6pt]
-2s\left[\frac{a\left(r-M\right)}{\Delta}+\frac{i\cos{\theta}}{\sin^2{\theta}}\right]\frac{\partial\psi}{\partial\phi} \\[6pt]
-2s\left[\frac{M\left(r^2-a^2\right)}{\Delta}-r-ia\cos{\theta}\right]\frac{\partial\psi}{\partial t} \\[6pt]
+\left(s^2\cot^2{\theta}-s\right)\psi=4\pi\Sigma T.
\end{aligned}$$

Here, $M$ is the mass of the black hole; $a$ is the angular momentum per unit mass, which corresponds to rotation; $\Delta=r^2-2Mr+a^2$; $\Sigma=r^2+a^2\cos^2{\theta}$; $\psi$ the perturbing field for the Kerr black hole; $T$ is the stress–energy tensor (source term); and $s$ the different types of perturbations, such that $s=0,\pm\frac{1}{2},\pm1,\ \pm2$, which depict scalar, neutrino, electromagnetic, and gravitational perturbations respectively.

This equation enables investigation of small disturbances around a Kerr black hole. This was foundational because the Kerr geometry is less symmetric than the Schwarzschild geometry, making it less obvious that the perturbation equations could be decoupled and separated nicely into radial and angular ordinary differential equations. Teukolsky’s review paper on the Kerr metric reviews all the current research for Kerr such as black hole stability, quasinormal modes, and others, in which some of these areas of current research for Kerr revolve around the Teukolsky equation.
