= Jorge Pullin =

Argentine physicist

Jorge Pullin (Latin American Spanish: [ˈpuʎin]; born 1963) is an Argentine-American theoretical physicist known for his work on black hole collisions and quantum gravity. He is the Horace Hearne Chair in theoretical Physics at the Louisiana State University.

== Biography ==
Jorge Pullin attended the University of Buenos Aires (electrical engineering) for two years before leaving for Instituto Balseiro in Argentina to finish a M.Sc. in physics (1986). Then he moved to the University of Córdoba to pursue his Ph.D. which was submitted in 1988 to the Instituto Balseiro; his advisor was Reinaldo J. Gleiser.

He moved to Syracuse University in 1989 and to the University of Utah in 1991 as a postdoc. He joined the faculty of Penn State University in 1993 as a lecturer, and was promoted to associate professor in 1997 and as a tenured professor in 2000. In 2001, he moved to Louisiana State University, where he is the co-director of the Horace Hearne Institute, along with Jonathan Dowling.

Pullin's wife Gabriela González is also a gravitational physics researcher; she and Pullin met at a gravitational physics meeting in Córdoba, Argentina. Pullin and González spent six years living apart while Pullin was at Penn State and González held a position at the Massachusetts Institute of Technology, a situation that was resolved when they both were hired by LSU.

== Awards and honors ==
In 1998, the John Simon Guggenheim Memorial Foundation selected Pullin as a Guggenheim Fellow, and in 2001 he won a Fulbright Fellowship to visit the Universidad de la Republica in Uruguay. In 2001, the American Physical Society honored him with the Edward A. Bouchet Award, recognizing him as "a distinguished minority physicist who has made significant contributions to physics research". He is a corresponding member of the National Academy of Science of Uruguay, the Mexican Academy of Sciences, the Argentinian National Academy of Sciences, and the Latin American Academy of Sciences, and a Fellow of the American Physical Society, of the Institute of Physics, and of the American Association for the Advancement of Science.

== Research ==
Pullin's book (with R. Gambini) Loops, Knots, Gauge Theories and Quantum Gravity surveys the state of the art in loop quantum gravity at the time of its publication. Reviewer Jerzy Lewandowski writes "the book should allow people from outside the loopy circles to gain access in the current state of the art. But most of all it allows experts within this wide field to learn more about the original constructions which were invented and applied in quantization of gravity by Gambini and Pullin themselves." Chris Isham adds that "this is a most valuable addition to the scientific literature", while Hugo A. Morales-Técotl calls it "useful for an immersion in the subject."

Pullin's most-cited research paper, on nonstandard optics, studies the propagation of light within theories of loop quantum gravity and shows that these theories lead to predictions of behavior different from Maxwell's equations for light propagation in classical physics. Pullin, Gambini, and Bernd Brügman also wrote a series of papers that make an important connection between knot theory and quantum gravity, by showing that the Jones polynomial can be used to solve a quantum form of Einstein's equations.

Pullin is also known for a series of papers on the theory and numerical simulation of colliding black holes. Pullin's early work on the subject (including his second most cited paper, from 1994) involves the "close approximation" in which a pair of nearby black holes is treated mathematically as a single non-spherical black hole; since joining LSU his work on this area has been based instead on supercomputer simulation. Another pair of his papers studies a simplified mathematical model of the radiation emitted when a star collapses into a black hole, and shows that it compares favorably to numerical simulations.

== Quantum mechanics ==
Pullin, along with R. Gambini, has proposed a new interpretation of quantum mechanics, called the `Montevideo interpretation'. This name was chosen for its similarity with the more orthodox `Copenhagen interpretation' and a reference to the city of origin. The Montevideo interpretation is an alternative to the Copenhagen interpretation, both seeking to understand the deepest meaning of quantum mechanics. The need for an interpretation is because the extremely-well-verified equations of quantum mechanics leaves unaddressed various issue concerning the nature of reality, the ultimate accuracy of measurement, hidden variables, and the idea of multiple universes. The issues revolve around the nature of the collapse of the quantum wave function as made by a measurement, with the famous example being understanding of Schroedinger's Cat. The Montevideo interpretation adds gravity into the picture, where there must be fundamental limits on the accuracy of any clock, and this introduces a decoherence into all systems, which acts as a measurement. "This interpretation explains the emergence of the classical world via decoherence through the interaction with the environment plus loss of coherence of the quantum theory when studied with real clocks and measuring rods... The combined effect of both losses of coherence implies that all information about quantum coherence in the system plus apparatus plus environment becomes inaccessible. After a while, there is no experimental arrangement that is able to decide if the evolution of the state of the complete quantum system was unitary or suffered a collapse. Whenever such situation of undecidability is reached, the interpretation assumes that an event (measurement) takes place." The physics of the Montevideo interpretation is all classical quantum mechanics and General Relativity, but the philosophical implications are deep.

== Editorial positions ==
Pullin is the founding editor of the journal Physical Review X published by the American Physical Society. Pullin is also one of the Managing Editors of the International Journal of Modern Physics D (covering covers specifically gravitation, astrophysics and cosmology, with topics such as general relativity, quantum gravity, cosmic particles and radiation) from 2005 to the present. Since 2004, Pullin is a member of the editorial board of Living Reviews in Relativity.
