= Horace Hearne Institute =

The Horace Hearne Jr. Institute for Theoretical Physics is at Louisiana State University. The Hearne Institute is funded by a donation of two endowed chairs by Horace Hearne Jr. and the State of Louisiana, as well as additional grants from a variety of national and international granting agencies. It currently has as co-directors James Sauls and Jorge Pullin. Jonathan Dowling was a former co-director. The institute hosts faculty, postdoctoral researchers, students — as well as long- and short-term visitors — who conduct research on quantum matter, fields and information and on gravitational physics. The Hearne Institute also sponsors international workshops on quantum matter, relativity and quantum gravity.
