= Entanglement monotone =

Concept in quantum information science

In quantum information and quantum computation, an entanglement monotone or entanglement measure is a function that quantifies the amount of entanglement present in a quantum state. Any entanglement monotone is a nonnegative function whose value does not increase under local operations and classical communication.

== Definition ==
Let $\mathcal{S}(\mathcal{H}_A\otimes\mathcal{H}_B)$be the space of all states, i.e., Hermitian positive semi-definite operators with trace one, over the bipartite Hilbert space $\mathcal{H}_A\otimes\mathcal{H}_B$. An entanglement measure is a function $\mu:{\displaystyle {\mathcal {S}}({\mathcal {H}}_{A}\otimes {\mathcal {H}}_{B})}\to \mathbb{R}_{\geq 0}$such that:

1. $\mu(\rho)=0$ if $\rho$ is separable;
2. Monotonically decreasing under LOCC, viz., for the Kraus operator $E_i\otimes F_i$ corresponding to the LOCC $\mathcal{E}_{LOCC}$, let $p_i=\mathrm{Tr}[(E_i\otimes F_i)\rho (E_i\otimes F_i)^{\dagger}]$ and $\rho_i=(E_i\otimes F_i)\rho (E_i\otimes F_i)^{\dagger}/\mathrm{Tr}[(E_i\otimes F_i)\rho (E_i\otimes F_i)^{\dagger}]$for a given state $\rho$, then (i) $\mu$ does not increase under the average over all outcomes, $\mu(\rho)\geq \sum_i p_i\mu(\rho_i)$ and (ii) $\mu$ does not increase if the outcomes are all discarded, $\mu(\rho)\geq \sum_i \mu(p_i\rho_i)$.

Some authors also add the condition that $\mu(\varrho)=1$ over the maximally entangled state $\varrho$. If the nonnegative function only satisfies condition 2 of the above, then it is called an entanglement monotone.

Various entanglement monotones exist for bipartite systems as well as for multipartite systems. Common entanglement monotones are the entropy of entanglement, concurrence, negativity, squashed entanglement, entanglement of formation and tangle.
