= Entropy of entanglement =

Concept in quantum physics

The entropy of entanglement (or entanglement entropy) is a measure of the degree of quantum entanglement between two subsystems constituting a two-part composite quantum system. Given a pure quantum state of the composite system, it is possible to obtain a reduced density matrix describing knowledge of the state of a subsystem. The entropy of entanglement is the Von Neumann entropy of the reduced density matrix for any of the subsystems. If it is non-zero, it indicates the two subsystems are entangled.

Mathematically, if a state describing two subsystems A and B $|\Psi_{AB}\rangle=|\phi_A\rangle\otimes|\phi_B\rangle$ is a product state, then the reduced density matrix $\rho_A=\operatorname{Tr}_B|\Psi_{AB}\rangle\langle\Psi_{AB}|=|\phi_A\rangle\langle\phi_A|$ is a pure state. Thus, the entropy of the state is zero; similarly, the density matrix of B would also have zero entropy. If the entropy of the reduced density matrix is nonzero, the reduced density matrix is a mixed state, which indicates that the subsystems A and B are entangled.

Entanglement entropy was first proposed by Sorkin as a source for black hole entropy, and remains a candidate. It is thought to have connections to gravity, and the possibility of induced gravity, following the work of Jacobson, and ideas of Sakharov.

== Bipartite entanglement entropy ==
Suppose that a quantum system consists of $N$ particles. A bipartition of the system is a partition which divides the system into two parts $A$ and $B$, containing $k$ and $l$ particles respectively with $k+l=N$. Bipartite entanglement entropy is defined with respect to this bipartition.

=== Von Neumann entanglement entropy ===
The bipartite von Neumann entanglement entropy $S$ is defined as the von Neumann entropy of either of its reduced states, since they are of the same value (can be proved from Schmidt decomposition of the state with respect to the bipartition); the result is independent of which one we pick. That is, for a pure state $\rho_{AB}= |\Psi\rangle\langle\Psi|_{AB}$, it is given by:

$$\mathcal{S}(\rho_A)=  -\operatorname{Tr}[\rho_A\operatorname{log}\rho_A] =  -\operatorname{Tr}[\rho_B\operatorname{log}\rho_B] = \mathcal{S}(\rho_B)$$

where $\rho_{A}=\operatorname{Tr}_B(\rho_{AB})$ and $\rho_{B}=\operatorname{Tr}_A(\rho_{AB})$ are the reduced density matrices for each partition.

The entanglement entropy can be expressed using the singular values of the Schmidt decomposition of the state. Any pure state can be written as $|\Psi \rangle = \sum_{i =1} ^m \alpha _i |u_i \rangle_A \otimes |v_i \rangle_B$ where $|u_i\rangle_A$ and $|v_i\rangle_B$ are orthonormal states in subsystem $A$ and subsystem $B$ respectively. The entropy of entanglement is simply:

$-\sum_i |\alpha_i|^2 \log(|\alpha_i|^2)$

This form of writing the entropy makes it explicitly clear that the entanglement entropy is the same regardless of whether one computes partial trace over the $A$ or $B$ subsystem.

Many entanglement measures reduce to the entropy of entanglement when evaluated on pure states. Among those are:

- Distillable entanglement
- Entanglement cost
- Entanglement of formation
- Relative entropy of entanglement
- Squashed entanglement

Some entanglement measures that do not reduce to the entropy of entanglement are:

- Negativity
- Logarithmic negativity
- Robustness of entanglement

=== Renyi entanglement entropies ===
The Rényi entanglement entropies $\mathcal{S}_\alpha$ are defined in terms of the reduced density matrices and a Rényi index $\alpha \geq 0$. They are given as the Rényi entropy of the reduced density matrices:

$$\mathcal{S}_\alpha (\rho_A) = \frac{1}{1-\alpha} \operatorname{log} \operatorname{tr} (\rho_A^\alpha) = \mathcal{S}_\alpha(\rho_B)$$

Note that in the limit $\alpha\rightarrow 1$, the Rényi entanglement entropy approaches the Von Neumann entanglement entropy.

== Example with coupled harmonic oscillators ==
Consider two coupled quantum harmonic oscillators, with positions $q_A$ and $q_B$, momenta $p_A$ and $p_B$, and system Hamiltonian

$$H=(p_A^2 + p_B^2)/2 +  \omega_1^2 ( q_A^2 + q_B^2)/{2} + { \omega_2^2 (q_A - q_B)^2}/{2}$$

With $\omega_\pm^2 = \omega_1^2 + \omega_2^2 \pm \omega_2^2$, the system's pure ground state density matrix is $\rho_{AB} = |0\rangle \langle 0|$, which in position basis is $\langle q_A, q_B | \rho_{AB} | q_A', q_B' \rangle \propto \exp \left( -{\omega_+ (q_A + q_B)^2}/{2} -{\omega_- (q_A - q_B)^2}/{2} -{\omega_+ (q'_A + q'_B)^2}/{2} -{\omega_- (q'_A - q'_B)^2}/{2} \right)$. Then

$\langle q_A | \rho_A | q_A' \rangle \propto \exp \left( \frac{2(\omega_+ - \omega_-)^2 q_A q_A' -(8\omega_+ \omega_- + (\omega_+ - \omega_-)^2)(q_A^2+q_A'^2) }{8(\omega_+ + \omega_-)} \right)$

Since $\rho_A$ happens to be precisely equal to the density matrix of a single quantum harmonic oscillator of frequency $\omega \equiv \sqrt{\omega_+ \omega_-}$ at thermal equilibrium with temperature $T$ ( such that $\omega/k_B T = \cosh^{-1} \left( \frac{8\omega_+ \omega_- + (\omega_+ - \omega_-)^2}{(\omega_+ - \omega_-)^2}\right)$ where $k_B$ is the Boltzmann constant), the eigenvalues of $\rho_A$ are $\lambda_n = (1-e^{-\omega/k_BT})e^{-n\omega/k_BT}$ for nonnegative integers $n$. The Von Neumann Entropy is thus

$$-\sum_n \lambda_n \ln(\lambda_n)  = \frac{\omega/k_BT}{e^{\omega/k_BT}-1} - \ln(1-e^{-\omega/k_BT})$$.

Similarly the Renyi entropy $S_\alpha (\rho_A) = \frac{(1-e^{- \omega/k_B T})^\alpha}{1-e^{-\alpha \omega/k_BT}}/(1-\alpha)$.

== Area law of bipartite entanglement entropy ==
A quantum state satisfies an area law if the leading term of the entanglement entropy grows at most proportionally with the boundary between the two partitions. Area laws are remarkably common for ground states of local gapped quantum many-body systems. This has important applications, one such application being that it greatly reduces the complexity of quantum many-body systems. The density matrix renormalization group and matrix product states, for example, implicitly rely on such area laws.
