= Multipartite entanglement =

Quantum entanglement of more than 2 qubits

In the case of systems composed of $m > 2$ subsystems, the classification of quantum-entangled states is richer than in the bipartite case. Indeed, in multipartite entanglement apart from fully separable states and fully entangled states, there also exists the notion of partially separable states.

== Full and partial separability ==
The definitions of fully separable and fully entangled multipartite states naturally generalizes that of separable and entangled states in the bipartite case, as follows.

=== Full m-partite separability (m-separability) of m systems ===
The state $\; \varrho_{A_1\ldots A_m}$ of $\; m$ subsystems $\; A_1, \ldots, A_m$ with Hilbert space $\; \mathcal{H}_{A_1 \ldots A_m}=\mathcal{H}_{A_1}\otimes\cdots\otimes \mathcal{H}_{A_m}$ is fully separable if and only if it can be written in the form

$$\; \varrho_{A_1\ldots A_m} = \sum_{i=1}^k p_i \varrho_{A_1}^i \otimes \cdots \otimes \varrho_{A_m}^i.$$

Correspondingly, the state $\; \varrho_{A_1\ldots A_m}$ is fully entangled if it cannot be written in the above form.

As in the bipartite case, the set of $\; m$-separable states is convex and closed with respect to trace norm, and separability is preserved under $\; m$-separable operations $\; \sum_i\Omega_i^1\otimes\cdots\otimes\Omega_i^n$ which are a straightforward generalization of the bipartite ones:

$\; \varrho_{A_1\ldots A_m}\to \frac{\sum_i\Omega_i^1\otimes\cdots\otimes\Omega_i^n\varrho_{A_1\ldots A_m} (\Omega_i^1\otimes\cdots\otimes\Omega_i^n)^\dagger}{\operatorname{Tr}[\sum_i \Omega_i^1\otimes\cdots\otimes\Omega_i^n\varrho_{A_1\ldots A_m} (\Omega_i^1\otimes\cdots\otimes\Omega_i^n)^\dagger]} .$

As mentioned above, though, in the multipartite setting we also have different notions of partial separability.

=== Separability with respect to partitions ===
The state $\; \varrho_{A_1\ldots A_m}$ of $\; m$ subsystems $\; A_1, \ldots, A_m$ is separable with respect to a given partition $\; \{I_1, \ldots, I_k\}$, where $\; I_i$ are disjoint subsets of the indices $\; I=\{1, \ldots, m\}, \bigcup_{j=1}^k I_j = I$, if and only if it can be written

$\; \varrho_{A_1\ldots A_m} = \sum_{i=1}^N p_i \varrho_1^i \otimes \cdots \otimes \varrho_k^i.$

=== Semiseparability ===
The state $\; \varrho_{A_1\ldots A_m}$ is semiseparable if and only if it is separable under all $\; 1$-$\; (m-1)$ partitions, $\; \big\{I_1=\{k\}, I_2=\{1,\ldots,k-1,k+1,\ldots,m\}\big\}, 1\leq k \leq m$.

=== k-producibility ===
An $\; m$-particle system is $\; k$-producible if it is a mixture of states such that each of them is separable with respect to some partition $\; \{I_1,\ldots,I_L\}$, where the size of $I_l$ is at most $k.$ If a state is not k-producible then it is at least $(k+1)$-particle entangled. s-particle entanglement has been detected in various experiments with many particles. Such experiments are often referred to as detecting the entanglement depth of the quantum state.

=== k-strechability of entanglement ===
For a pure state, which is k-producible, but not $(k-1)$-producible and is h-separable, but not $(h+1)$-separable, the strechability is $k-h.$ The definition can be extended to mixed states in the usual manner. One can define further properties based on the partitioning of particles into groups, which have extensively been studied.

== Separability characterization and criteria ==
=== Pure states ===
An equivalent definition to Full m-partite separability is given as follows: The pure state $|\Psi_{A_1\ldots A_m}\rangle$ of $\; m$ subsystems $\; A_1, \ldots, A_m$ is fully $\; m$-partite separable if and only if it can be written

$\; |\Psi_{A_1\ldots A_m}\rangle = |\psi_{A_1}\rangle \otimes \cdots \otimes |\psi_{A_m}\rangle.$

In order to check this, it is enough to compute reduced density matrices of elementary subsystems and see whether they are pure. However, this cannot be done so easily in the multipartite case, as only rarely multipartite pure states admit the generalized Schmidt decomposition $\; |\Psi_{A_1\ldots A_m}\rangle = \sum_{i=1}^{\min\{d_{A_1},\ldots,d_{A_m}\}}a_i |e_{A_1}^i\rangle \otimes \cdots \otimes |e_{A_m}^i\rangle$. A multipartite state admits generalized Schmidt decomposition if, tracing out any subsystem, the rest is in a fully separable state. Thus, in general the entanglement of a pure state is described by the spectra of the reduced density matrices of all bipartite partitions: the state is genuinely $\; m$-partite entangled if and only if all bipartite partitions produce mixed reduced density matrices.

=== Mixed states ===
In the multipartite case there is no simple necessary and sufficient condition for separability like the one given by the PPT criterion for the $2\otimes2$ and $2\otimes3$ cases. However, many separability criteria used in the bipartite setting can be generalized to the multipartite case.

==== Positive but not completely positive (PnCP) maps and entanglement witnesses ====
The characterization of separability in terms of positive but not completely positive maps can be naturally generalized from the bipartite case, as follows.

Any positive but not completely positive (PnCP) map $\; \Lambda_{A_2\ldots A_m}:\mathcal{B}(\mathcal{H}_{A_2\ldots A_m}) \to \mathcal{B}(\mathcal{H}_{A_1})$ provides a nontrivial necessary separability criterion in the form:

$$\; (I_{A_1}\otimes \Lambda_{A_2\ldots A_m})[\varrho_{A_1\ldots A_m}] \geq 0 ,$$

where $\; I_{A_1}$ is the identity acting on the first subsystem $\; \mathcal{H}_{A_1}$. The state $\; \varrho_{A_1\ldots A_m}$ is separable if and only if the above condition is satisfied for all PnCP maps $\; \Lambda_{A_2\ldots A_m}:\mathcal{B}(\mathcal{H}_{A_2\ldots A_m}) \to \mathcal{B}(\mathcal{H}_{A_1})$.

The definition of entanglement witnesses and the Choi–Jamiołkowski isomorphism that links PnCP maps to entanglement witnesses in the bipartite case can also be generalized to the multipartite setting. We therefore get a separability condition from entanglement witnesses for multipartite states: the state $\; \varrho_{A_1\ldots A_m}$ is separable if it has non-negative mean value $\; \operatorname{Tr}(W\varrho_{A_1\ldots A_m}) \geq 0$ for all entanglement witnesses $W$. Correspondingly, the entanglement of $\; \varrho_{A_1\ldots A_m}$ is detected by the witness $\; W$ if and only if $\; \operatorname{Tr}(W\varrho_{A_1\ldots A_m}) < 0$.

The above description provides a full characterization of $\; m$-separability of $\; m$-partite systems.

==== Range criterion ====
The "range criterion" can also be immediately generalized from the bipartite to the multipartite case. In the latter case the range of $\; \varrho_{A_1\ldots A_m}$ must be spanned by the vectors $\; \{|\varphi_{A_1}\rangle, \ldots, |\varphi_{ A_m}\rangle\}$, while the range of $\; \varrho_{A_1\ldots A_m}^{T_{A_{k_1}\ldots A_{k_l}}}$ partially transposed with respect to the subset $\; \{A_{k_1}\ldots A_{k_l}\} \subset \{A_1\ldots A_m\}$ must be spanned by the products of these vectors where those with indices $\; k_1, \ldots, k_l$ are complex conjugated. If the state $\; \varrho_{A_1\ldots A_m}$ is separable, then all such partial transposes must lead to matrices with non-negative spectrum, i.e. all the matrices $\; \varrho_{A_1\ldots A_m}^{T_{A_{k_1}\ldots A_{k_l}}}$ should be states themselves.

==== Realignment criteria ====
The "realignment criteria" from the bipartite case are generalized to permutational criteria in the multipartite setting: if the state $\varrho_{A_1\ldots A_m}$ is separable, then the matrix $\; [R_\pi(\varrho_{A_1\ldots A_m})]_{i_1j_1,i_2j_2,\ldots,i_nj_n}\equiv\varrho_{\pi(i_1j_1,i_2j_2,\ldots,i_nj_n)}$, obtained from the original state via permutation $\; \pi$ of matrix indices in product basis, satisfies $\; ||R_\pi(\varrho_{A_1\ldots A_m})]||_\operatorname{Tr}\leq1$.

==== Contraction criterion ====
Finally, the contraction criterion generalizes immediately from the bipartite to the multipartite case.

== Multipartite entanglement measures ==
Many of the axiomatic entanglement measures for bipartite states, such as relative entropy of entanglement, robustness of entanglement and squashed entanglement can be generalized to the multipartite setting.

The relative entropy of entanglement, for example, can be generalized to the multipartite case by taking a suitable set in place of the set of bipartite separable states. One can take the set of fully separable states, even though with this choice the measure will not distinguish between truly multipartite entanglement and several instances of bipartite entanglement, such as $\mathrm{EPR}_{AB}\otimes \mathrm{EPR}_{CD}$. In order to analyze truly multipartite entanglement one has to consider the set of states containing no more than $k$-particle entanglement.

In the case of squashed entanglement, its multipartite version can be obtained by simply replacing the mutual information of the bipartite system with its generalization for multipartite systems, i.e. $I(A_1 : \ldots : A_N) = S(A_1) + \cdots + S(A_N) - S(A_1 \ldots A_N)$.

However, in the multipartite setting many more parameters are needed to describe the entanglement of the states, and therefore many new entanglement measures have been constructed, especially for pure multipartite states.

=== Multipartite entanglement measures for pure states ===
In the multipartite setting there are entanglement measures that simply are functions of sums of bipartite entanglement measures, as, for instance, the global entanglement, which is given by the sum of concurrences between one qubit and all others. For these multipartite entanglement measures the monotonicity under LOCC is simply inherited from the bipartite measures. But there are also entanglement measures that were constructed specifically for multipartite states, as the following:

==== Tangle ====
The first multipartite entanglement measure that is neither a direct generalization nor an easy combination of bipartite measures was introduced by Coffman et al. and called tangle.

Definition:

$$\; \tau(A : B : C) = \tau(A : BC) - \tau(AB) - \tau(AC) ,$$

where the $\; 2$-tangles on the right-hand-side are the squares of concurrence.

The tangle measure is permutationally invariant; it vanishes on all states that are separable under any cut; it is nonzero, for example, on the GHZ-state; it can be thought to be zero for states that are 3-entangled (i.e. that are not product with respect to any cut) as, for instance, the W-state. Moreover, there might be the possibility to obtain a good generalization of the tangle for multiqubit systems by means of hyperdeterminant.

==== Schmidt measure ====
This was one of the first entanglement measures constructed specifically for multipartite states.

Definition:

The minimum of $\; \log r$, where $\; r$ is the number of terms in an expansion of the state in product basis.

This measure is zero if and only if the state is fully product; therefore, it cannot distinguish between truly multipartite entanglement and bipartite entanglement, but it may nevertheless be useful in many contexts.

==== Measures based on normal forms ====
This is an interesting class of multipartite entanglement measures obtained in the context of classification of states. Namely, one considers any homogeneous function of the state: if it is invariant under SLOCC (stochastic LOCC) operations with determinant equal to 1, then it is an entanglement monotone in the strong sense, i.e. it satisfies the condition of strong monotonicity.

==== Measures based on hyperdeterminant ====
It was proved by Miyake that hyperdeterminants are entanglement monotones and they describe truly multipartite entanglement in the sense that states such as products of $EPR$'s have zero entanglement. In particular concurrence and tangle are special cases of hyperdeterminant. Indeed, for two qubits concurrence is simply the modulus of the determinant, which is the hyperdeterminant of first order; whereas the tangle is the hyperdeterminant of second order, i.e. a function of tensors with three indices.

==== Geometric entanglement ====
The geometric measure of entanglement of $\psi$ is the minimum of

$$\| \psi - \varphi \|_2$$

with respect to all the separable states

$$\varphi = \bigotimes_{i=1}^N \varphi_i   .$$

This approach works for distinguishable particles or the spin systems. For identical or indistinguishable fermions or bosons, the full Hilbert space is not the tensor product of those of each individual particle. Therefore, a simple modification is necessary. For example, for identical fermions, since the full wave function $\psi$ is now completely anti-symmetric, so is required for $\varphi$. This means, the $\varphi$ taken to approximate $\psi$ should be a Slater determinant wave function.

==== Localisable entanglement ====
This entanglement measure is a generalization of the entanglement of assistance and was constructed in the context of spin chains. Namely, one chooses two spins and performs LOCC operations that aim at obtaining the largest possible bipartite entanglement between them (measured according to a chosen entanglement measure for two bipartite states).
