= Negativity (quantum mechanics) =

Measure of quantum entanglement in quantum mechanics

In quantum mechanics, negativity is a measure of quantum entanglement which is easy to compute. It is a measure deriving from the PPT criterion for separability. It has been shown to be an entanglement monotone and hence a proper measure of entanglement.

== Definition ==
The negativity of a subsystem $A$ can be defined in terms of a density matrix $\rho$ as:

$$\mathcal{N}(\rho) \equiv \frac{||\rho^{\Gamma_A}||_1-1}{2}$$

where:

- $\rho^{\Gamma_A}$ is the partial transpose of $\rho$ with respect to subsystem $A$
- $||X||_1 = \text{Tr}|X| = \text{Tr} \sqrt{X^\dagger X}$ is the trace norm or the sum of the singular values of the operator $X$.

An alternative and equivalent definition is the absolute sum of the negative eigenvalues of $\rho^{\Gamma_A}$:

$$\mathcal{N}(\rho) = \left|\sum_{\lambda_i < 0} \lambda_i \right| = \sum_i \frac{|\lambda_{i}|-\lambda_{i}}{2}$$

where $\lambda_i$ are all of the eigenvalues.

=== Properties ===
- Is a convex function of $\rho$:

$$\mathcal{N}(\sum_{i}p_{i}\rho_{i}) \le \sum_{i}p_{i}\mathcal{N}(\rho_{i})$$

- Is an entanglement monotone:

$$\mathcal{N}(P(\rho)) \le \mathcal{N}(\rho)$$

where $P(\rho)$ is an arbitrary LOCC operation over $\rho$

== Logarithmic negativity ==
The logarithmic negativity is an entanglement measure which is easily computable and an upper bound to the distillable entanglement. It is defined as

$$E_N(\rho) \equiv \log_2 ||\rho^{\Gamma_A}||_1$$

where $\Gamma_A$ is the partial transpose operation and $|| \cdot ||_1$ denotes the trace norm.

It relates to the negativity as follows:

$$E_N(\rho) := \log_2( 2 \mathcal{N} +1)$$

=== Properties ===
The logarithmic negativity

- can be zero even if the state is entangled (if the state is PPT entangled).
- does not reduce to the entropy of entanglement on pure states like most other entanglement measures.
- is additive on tensor products: $E_N(\rho \otimes \sigma) = E_N(\rho) + E_N(\sigma)$
- is not asymptotically continuous. That means that for a sequence of bipartite Hilbert spaces $H_1, H_2, \ldots$ (typically with increasing dimension) we can have a sequence of quantum states $\rho_1, \rho_2, \ldots$ which converges to $\rho^{\otimes n_1}, \rho^{\otimes n_2}, \ldots$ (typically with increasing $n_i$) in the trace distance, but the sequence $E_N(\rho_1)/n_1, E_N(\rho_2)/n_2, \ldots$ does not converge to $E_N(\rho)$.
- is an upper bound to the distillable entanglement
