= Quantum entanglement =

Physics phenomenon

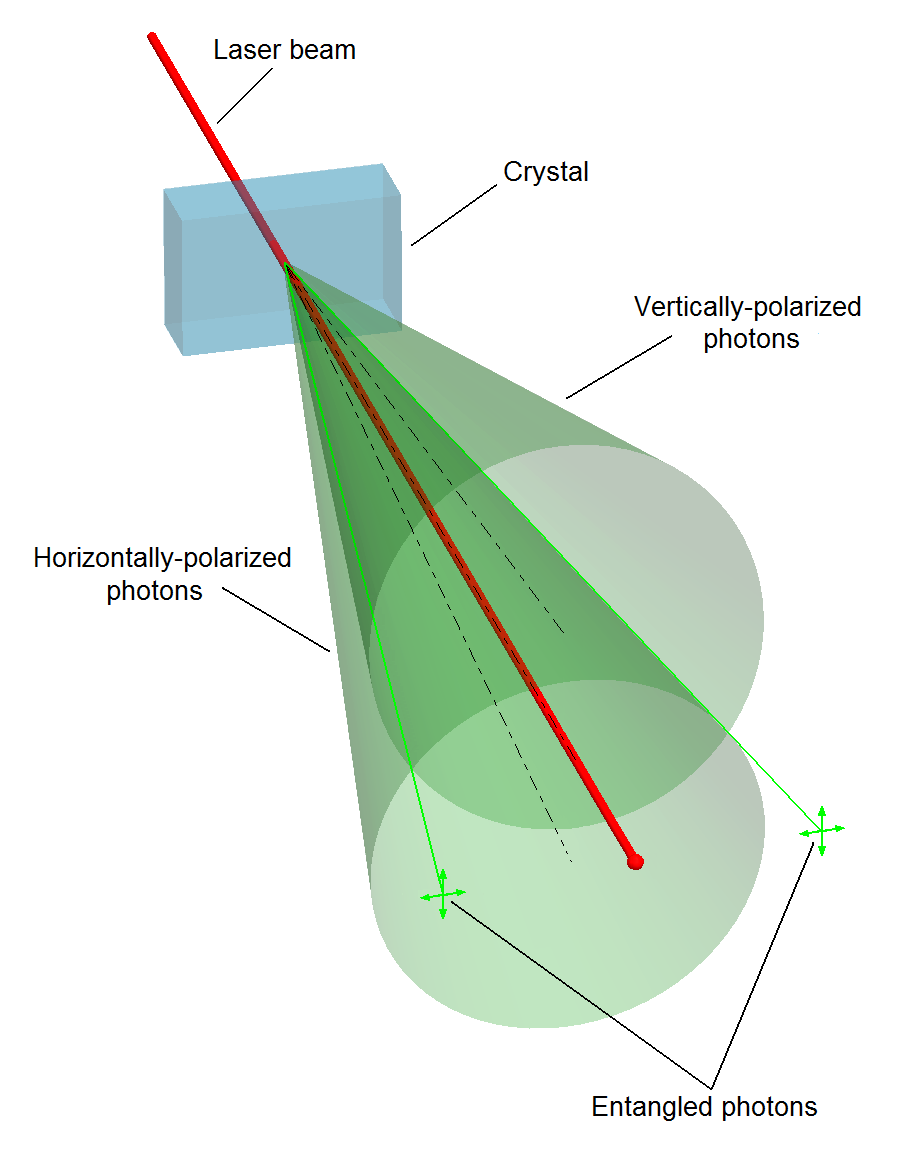
Spontaneous parametric down-conversion process can split photons into type II photon pairs with mutually perpendicular polarization.

Quantum entanglement is the phenomenon in which the quantum state of each particle in a group cannot be described independently of the state of the others, even when the particles are separated by a large distance. The topic of quantum entanglement is at the heart of the disparity between classical physics and quantum physics: entanglement is a primary feature of quantum mechanics not present in classical mechanics.

Measurements of physical properties such as position, momentum, spin, and polarization performed on entangled particles can, in some cases, be found to be perfectly correlated. For example, if a pair of entangled particles is generated such that their total spin is known to be zero, and one particle is found to have clockwise spin on a first axis, then the spin of the other particle, measured on the same axis, is found to be counterclockwise. This behavior gives rise to seemingly paradoxical effects: any measurement of a particle's properties results in an apparent and irreversible wave function collapse of that particle and changes the original quantum state. With entangled particles, such measurements affect the entangled system as a whole.

Entanglement is a resource in quantum information science. It allows tasks that classical physics cannot do, such as quantum teleportation, and it is used in some methods of quantum cryptography. Most researchers believe it is needed for quantum computing, though some dispute this. Entanglement cannot carry information faster than light, so these uses also need ordinary communication channels.

Such phenomena were the subject of a 1935 paper by Albert Einstein, Boris Podolsky, and Nathan Rosen, and several papers by Erwin Schrödinger shortly thereafter, describing what came to be known as the EPR paradox. Einstein and others considered such behavior impossible, as it violated the local realism view of causality and argued that the accepted formulation of quantum mechanics must therefore be incomplete.

Later, the counterintuitive predictions of quantum mechanics were verified in tests where polarization or spin of entangled particles were measured at separate locations, statistically violating Bell's inequality. This established that the correlations produced from quantum entanglement cannot be explained in terms of local hidden variables.

Entanglement can produce statistical correlations between events in widely separated places, but it cannot be used for faster-than-light communication. Quantum entanglement has been demonstrated experimentally with photons, electrons, top quarks, molecules and even small diamonds. The use of quantum entanglement in communication and computation is an active area of research and development.

== History ==
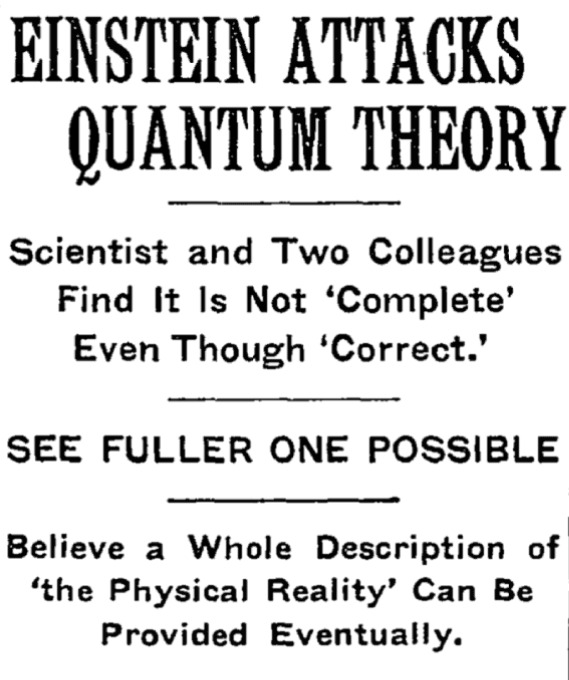
Article headline regarding the Einstein–Podolsky–Rosen (EPR) paradox paper, in the 4 May 1935 issue of The New York Times

Albert Einstein and Niels Bohr engaged in a long-running collegial dispute over the interpretation of quantum mechanics, now known as the Bohr–Einstein debates. During these debates, Einstein introduced a thought experiment involving a box that emits a photon. He noted that the experimenter's choice of which measurement to make on the box would change what can be predicted about the photon, even when the photon is very far away. This argument, which Einstein had formulated by 1931, was an early recognition of what would later be called entanglement. That same year, Hermann Weyl observed in his textbook on group theory and quantum mechanics that quantum systems composed of multiple interacting parts exhibit a kind of Gestalt, in which "the whole is greater than the sum of its parts". In 1932, Erwin Schrödinger derived the defining equations of quantum entanglement but left them unpublished. In 1935, Grete Hermann studied the mathematics of an electron interacting with a photon and noted the phenomenon that would later be called entanglement. Later that same year, Einstein, Boris Podolsky and Nathan Rosen published a paper on what is now known as the Einstein–Podolsky–Rosen (EPR) paradox, a thought experiment that attempted to show that "the quantum-mechanical description of physical reality given by wave functions is not complete". Their thought experiment considered two systems that interact and then separate, and they argued that, afterward, quantum mechanics could not describe the two systems individually.

Shortly after this paper appeared, Erwin Schrödinger wrote a letter to Einstein in German in which he used the word Verschränkung (translated by himself as entanglement) to describe situations like that of the EPR scenario. Schrödinger followed up with a full paper defining and discussing the notion of entanglement, saying "I would not call [entanglement] one but rather the characteristic trait of quantum mechanics, the one that enforces its entire departure from classical lines of thought." Like Einstein, Schrödinger was dissatisfied with the concept of entanglement, because it seemed to violate the speed limit on the transmission of information implicit in the theory of relativity. Einstein later disparaged quantum mechanics for seemingly exhibiting "spukhafte Fernwirkung", or "spooky action at a distance", meaning the acquisition of a value of a property at one location resulting from a measurement at a distant location.

In 1946, John Archibald Wheeler suggested studying the polarization of pairs of gamma-ray photons produced by electron–positron annihilation. Chien-Shiung Wu and Irving Shaknov carried out this experiment in 1949, thereby demonstrating that the entangled particle pairs considered by EPR could be created in the laboratory. Despite Schrödinger's claim of its importance, little work on entanglement was published for decades after his paper was published. In 1964 John S. Bell demonstrated an upper limit, seen in Bell's inequality, regarding the strength of correlations that can be produced in any theory obeying local realism, and showed that quantum theory predicts violations of this limit for certain entangled systems. His inequality is experimentally testable, and there have been numerous relevant experiments, starting with the pioneering work of Stuart Freedman and John Clauser in 1972, and Alain Aspect's experiments in 1982.

While Bell actively discouraged students from pursuing work like his as too esoteric, after a talk at Oxford a student named Artur Ekert suggested that the violation of a Bell inequality could be used as a resource for communication. Ekert followed up by publishing a quantum key distribution protocol called E91 based on it. In 1992, the entanglement concept was leveraged to propose quantum teleportation, an effect that was realized experimentally in 1997. Beginning in the mid-1990s, Anton Zeilinger used the generation of entanglement via parametric down-conversion to develop entanglement swapping and demonstrate quantum cryptography with entangled photons. In 2022, the Nobel Prize in Physics was awarded to Aspect, Clauser, and Zeilinger "for experiments with entangled photons, establishing the violation of Bell inequalities and pioneering quantum information science".

== Concept ==
=== Meaning of entanglement ===
Just as energy is a resource that facilitates mechanical operations, entanglement is a resource that facilitates performing tasks that involve communication and computation. The mathematical definition of entanglement can be paraphrased as saying that maximal knowledge about the whole of a system does not imply maximal knowledge about the individual parts of that system. If the quantum state that describes a pair of particles is entangled, then the results of measurements upon one half of the pair can be strongly correlated with the results of measurements upon the other. However, entanglement is not the same as "correlation" as understood in classical probability theory and in daily life. Instead, entanglement can be thought of as potential correlation that can be used to generate actual correlation in an appropriate experiment. The correlations generated from an entangled quantum state cannot in general be replicated by classical probability.

An example of entanglement is a subatomic particle that decays into an entangled pair of other particles. The decay events obey the various conservation laws, and as a result, the measurement outcomes of one daughter particle must be highly correlated with the measurement outcomes of the other daughter particle (so that the total momenta, angular momenta, energy, and so forth remains roughly the same before and after this process). For instance, a spin-zero particle could decay into a pair of spin-1/2 particles. If there is no orbital angular momentum, the total spin angular momentum after this decay must be zero (by the conservation of angular momentum). Whenever the first particle is measured to be spin up on some axis, the other, when measured on the same axis, is always found to be spin down. This is called the spin anti-correlated case and the pair is said to be in the singlet state. Perfect anti-correlations like this could be explained by "hidden variables" within the particles. For example, we could hypothesize that the particles are made in pairs such that one carries a value of "up" while the other carries a value of "down". Then, knowing the result of the spin measurement upon one particle, we could predict that the other will have the opposite value. Bell illustrated this with a story about a colleague, Bertlmann, who always wore socks with mismatching colors. "Which colour he will have on a given foot on a given day is quite unpredictable," Bell wrote, but upon observing "that the first sock is pink you can be already sure that the second sock will not be pink." Revealing the remarkable features of quantum entanglement requires considering multiple distinct experiments, such as spin measurements along different axes, and comparing the correlations obtained in these different configurations.

Quantum systems can become entangled through various types of interactions. For some ways in which entanglement may be achieved for experimental purposes, see the section below on methods. Entanglement is broken when the entangled particles decohere through interaction with the environment; for example, when a measurement is made. In more detail, this process involves the particles becoming entangled with the environment, as a consequence of which, the quantum state describing the particles themselves is no longer entangled. Mathematically, an entangled system can be defined to be one whose quantum state cannot be factored as a product of states of its local constituents; that is to say, they are not individual particles but are an inseparable whole. When entanglement is present, one constituent cannot be fully described without considering the other(s). The state of a composite system is always expressible as a sum, or superposition, of products of states of local constituents; it is entangled if this sum cannot be written as a single product term.

=== Paradox ===
The singlet state described above is the basis for one version of the EPR paradox. In this variant, introduced by David Bohm, a source emits particles and sends them in opposite directions. The state describing each pair is entangled. In the standard textbook presentation of quantum mechanics, performing a spin measurement on one of the particles causes the wave function for the whole pair to collapse into a state in which each particle has a definite spin (either up or down) along the axis of measurement. The outcome is random, with each possibility having a probability of 50%. However, if both spins are measured along the same axis, they are found to be anti-correlated. This means that the random outcome of the measurement made on one particle seems to have been transmitted to the other, so that it can make the "right choice" when it too is measured.

The distance and timing of the measurements can be chosen so as to make the interval between the two measurements spacelike, hence, any causal effect connecting the events would have to travel faster than light. According to the principles of special relativity, it is not possible for any information to travel between two such measuring events. It is not even possible to say which of the measurements came first. For two spacelike separated events x_{1} and x_{2} there are inertial frames in which x_{1} is first and others in which x_{2} is first. Therefore, the correlation between the two measurements cannot be explained as one measurement determining the other: different observers would disagree about the role of cause and effect.

=== Failure of local hidden-variable theories ===
A possible resolution to the paradox is to assume that quantum theory is incomplete, and the result of measurements depends on predetermined "hidden variables". The state of the particles being measured contains some hidden variables, whose values effectively determine, right from the moment of separation, what the outcomes of the spin measurements are going to be. This would mean that each particle carries all the required information with it, and nothing needs to be transmitted from one particle to the other at the time of measurement. Einstein and others originally believed this was the only way out of the paradox, and the accepted quantum mechanical description (with a random measurement outcome) must be incomplete. Local hidden variable theories fail when measurements of the spin of entangled particles along different axes are considered. If a large number of pairs of such measurements are made (on a large number of pairs of entangled particles), then statistically, if the local realist or hidden variables view were correct, the results would always satisfy Bell's inequality. A number of experiments have shown in practice that Bell's inequality is not satisfied. Moreover, when measurements of the entangled particles are made in moving relativistic reference frames, in which each measurement (in its own relativistic time frame) occurs before the other, the measurement results remain correlated.

The fundamental issue about measuring spin along different axes is that these measurements cannot have definite values at the same time―they are incompatible in the sense that these measurements' maximum simultaneous precision is constrained by the uncertainty principle. This is contrary to what is found in classical physics, where any number of properties can be measured simultaneously with arbitrary accuracy. It has been proven mathematically that compatible measurements cannot show Bell-inequality-violating correlations, and thus entanglement is a fundamentally non-classical phenomenon.

== Nonlocality and entanglement ==
As discussed above, entanglement is necessary to produce a violation of a Bell inequality. However, the mere presence of entanglement alone is insufficient, as Bell himself noted in his 1964 paper. This is demonstrated, for example, by Werner states, which are a family of states describing pairs of particles. For some values of their defining parameter, Werner states are entangled but admit a local hidden-variable model for projective measurements. These measurements therefore cannot violate a Bell inequality, despite the entanglement. This can be generalized from pairs of particles to larger collections as well.

The violation of Bell inequalities is often called quantum nonlocality. This term is not without controversy. It is sometimes argued that using the term nonlocality carries the unwarranted implication that the violation of Bell inequalities must be explained by physical, faster-than-light signals. In other words, the failure of local hidden-variable models to reproduce quantum mechanics is not necessarily a sign of true nonlocality in quantum mechanics itself. Despite these reservations, the term nonlocality has become a widespread convention.

The term nonlocality is sometimes applied to other concepts besides the nonexistence of a local hidden-variable model, such as whether states can be distinguished by local measurements. Moreover, quantum field theory is often said to be local because observables defined within spacetime regions that are spacelike separated must commute. These other uses of local and nonlocal are not discussed further here.

== Mathematical details ==
The following subsections use the formalism and theoretical framework developed in the articles bra–ket notation and mathematical formulation of quantum mechanics.

=== Pure states ===
Consider two arbitrary quantum systems A and B, with respective Hilbert spaces H_{A} and H_{B}. The Hilbert space of the composite system is the tensor product

$$H_A \otimes H_B.$$

If the first system is in state $| \psi \rangle_A$ and the second in state $| \phi \rangle_B$, the state of the composite system is

$$|\psi\rangle_A \otimes |\phi\rangle_B.$$

States of the composite system that can be represented in this form are called separable states, or product states. However, not all states of the composite system are separable. Fix a basis $\{|i \rangle_A\}$ for H_{A} and a basis $\{|j \rangle_B\}$ for H_{B}. The most general state in H_{A} ⊗ H_{B} is of the form

$$|\psi\rangle_{AB} = \sum_{i,j} c_{ij} |i\rangle_A \otimes |j\rangle_B$$.

This state is separable if there exist vectors $[c^A_i], [c^B_j]$ so that $c_{ij}= c^A_i c^B_j,$ yielding $|\psi\rangle_A = \sum_{i} c^A_{i} |i\rangle_A$ and $|\phi\rangle_B = \sum_{j} c^B_{j} |j\rangle_B.$ It is inseparable if for any vectors $[c^A_i],[c^B_j]$ at least for one pair of coordinates $c^A_i,c^B_j$ we have $c_{ij} \neq c^A_ic^B_j.$ If a state is inseparable, it is called an 'entangled state'.

For example, given two basis vectors $\{|0\rangle_A, |1\rangle_A\}$ of H_{A} and two basis vectors $\{|0\rangle_B, |1\rangle_B\}$ of H_{B}, the following is an entangled state:

$$\tfrac{1}{\sqrt{2}} \left ( |0\rangle_A \otimes |1\rangle_B - |1\rangle_A \otimes |0\rangle_B \right ).$$

If the composite system is in this state, it is impossible to attribute to either system A or system B a definite pure state. Another way to say this is that while the von Neumann entropy of the whole state is zero (as it is for any pure state), the entropy of the subsystems is greater than zero. In this sense, the systems are "entangled". The above example is one of four Bell states, which are (maximally) entangled pure states (pure states of the H_{A} ⊗ H_{B} space, but which cannot be separated into pure states of each H_{A} and H_{B}).

Now suppose Alice is an observer for system A, and Bob is an observer for system B. If in the entangled state given above Alice makes a measurement in the $\{|0\rangle, |1\rangle\}$ eigenbasis of A, there are two possible outcomes, occurring with equal probability: Alice can obtain the outcome 0, or she can obtain the outcome 1. If she obtains the outcome 0, then she can predict with certainty that Bob's result will be 1. Likewise, if she obtains the outcome 1, then she can predict with certainty that Bob's result will be 0. In other words, the results of measurements on the two qubits will be perfectly anti-correlated. This remains true even if the systems A and B are spatially separated. This is the foundation of the EPR paradox. The outcome of Alice's measurement is random. Alice cannot decide which state to collapse the composite system into, and therefore cannot transmit information to Bob by acting on her system. Causality is thus preserved, in this particular scheme. For the general argument, see no-communication theorem.

=== Ensembles ===
As mentioned above, a state of a quantum system is given by a unit vector in a Hilbert space. More generally, if one has less information about the system, then one calls it an 'ensemble' and describes it by a density matrix, which is a positive-semidefinite matrix, or a trace class when the state space is infinite-dimensional, and which has trace 1. By the spectral theorem, such a matrix takes the general form:

$$\rho = \sum_i w_i |\alpha_i\rangle \langle\alpha_i|,$$

where the w_{i} are positive-valued probabilities (they sum up to 1), the vectors α_{i} are unit vectors, and in the infinite-dimensional case, we would take the closure of such states in the trace norm. We can interpret ρ as representing an ensemble where $w_i$ is the proportion of the ensemble whose states are $|\alpha_i\rangle$. When a mixed state has rank 1, it therefore describes a 'pure ensemble'. When there is less than total information about the state of a quantum system we need density matrices to represent the state.

Experimentally, a mixed ensemble might be realized as follows. Consider a "black box" apparatus that spits electrons towards an observer. The electrons' Hilbert spaces are identical. The apparatus might produce electrons that are all in the same state; in this case, the electrons received by the observer are then a pure ensemble. However, the apparatus could produce electrons in different states. For example, it could produce two populations of electrons: one with state $|\mathbf{z}+\rangle$ with spins aligned in the positive z direction, and the other with state $|\mathbf{y}-\rangle$ with spins aligned in the negative y direction. Generally, this is a mixed ensemble, as there can be any number of populations, each corresponding to a different state. Following the definition above, for a bipartite composite system, mixed states are just density matrices on H_{A} ⊗ H_{B}. That is, it has the general form

$$\rho =\sum_{i} w_i\left[\sum_{j} \bar{c}_{ij} (|\alpha_{ij}\rangle\otimes|\beta_{ij}\rangle)\right]\left[\sum_k c_{ik} (\langle\alpha_{ik}|\otimes\langle\beta_{ik}|)\right]$$

where the w_{i} are positively valued probabilities, $\sum_j |c_{ij}|^2=1$, and the vectors are unit vectors. This is self-adjoint and positive and has trace 1.

Extending the definition of separability from the pure case, we say that a mixed state is separable if it can be written as

$$\rho = \sum_i w_i \rho_i^A \otimes \rho_i^B,$$

where the w_{i} are positively valued probabilities and the $\rho_i^A$s and $\rho_i^B$s are themselves mixed states (density operators) on the subsystems A and B respectively. In other words, a state is separable if it is a probability distribution over uncorrelated states, or product states. By writing the density matrices as sums of pure ensembles and expanding, we may assume without loss of generality that $\rho_i^A$ and $\rho_i^B$ are themselves pure ensembles. A state is then said to be entangled if it is not separable. In general, finding out whether or not a mixed state is entangled is considered difficult. The general bipartite case has been shown to be NP-hard. For the 2 × 2 and 2 × 3 cases, a necessary and sufficient criterion for separability is given by the famous Positive Partial Transpose (PPT) condition.

=== Reduced density matrices ===
The idea of a reduced density matrix was introduced by Paul Dirac in 1930. Consider as above systems A and B each with a Hilbert space H_{A}, H_{B}. Let the state of the composite system be

$$|\Psi \rangle \in H_A \otimes H_B.$$

As indicated above, in general there is no way to associate a pure state to the component system A. However, it still is possible to associate a density matrix. Let

$$\rho_T = |\Psi\rangle \; \langle\Psi|$$.

which is the projection operator onto this state. The state of A is the partial trace of ρ_{T} over the basis of system B:

$$\rho_A \ \stackrel{\mathrm{def}}{=}\ \sum_j^{N_B} \left( I_A \otimes \langle j|_B \right) \left( |\Psi\rangle \langle\Psi| \right)\left( I_A \otimes |j\rangle_B \right) = \hbox{Tr}_B \; \rho_T.$$

The sum occurs over $N_B := \dim(H_B)$ and $I_A$ the identity operator in $H_A$. ρ_{A} is sometimes called the reduced density matrix of ρ on subsystem A. Colloquially, we "trace out" or "trace over" system B to obtain the reduced density matrix on A.

For example, the reduced density matrix of A for the entangled state

$$\tfrac{1}{\sqrt{2}} \left ( |0\rangle_A \otimes |1\rangle_B - |1\rangle_A \otimes |0\rangle_B \right),$$

discussed above is

$$\rho_A = \tfrac{1}{2} \left ( |0\rangle_A \langle 0|_A + |1\rangle_A \langle 1|_A \right ).$$

This demonstrates that the reduced density matrix for an entangled pure ensemble is a mixed ensemble. In contrast, the density matrix of A for the pure product state $|\psi\rangle_A \otimes |\phi\rangle_B$ discussed above is

$$\rho_A = |\psi\rangle_A \langle\psi|_A,$$

the projection operator onto $|\psi\rangle_A$.

In general, a bipartite pure state ρ is entangled if and only if its reduced states are mixed rather than pure.

=== Entanglement as a resource ===
In quantum information theory, entangled states are considered a 'resource', i.e., something costly to produce and that allows implementing valuable transformations. The setting in which this perspective is most evident is that of "distant labs", i.e., two quantum systems labelled "A" and "B" on each of which arbitrary quantum operations can be performed, but which do not interact with each other quantum mechanically. The only interaction allowed is the exchange of classical information, which combined with the most general local quantum operations gives rise to the class of operations called LOCC (local operations and classical communication). These operations do not allow the production of entangled states between systems A and B. But if A and B are provided with a supply of entangled states, then these, together with LOCC operations can enable a larger class of transformations.

If Alice and Bob share an entangled state, Alice can tell Bob over a telephone call how to reproduce a quantum state $|\Psi\rangle$ she has in her lab. Alice performs a joint measurement on $|\Psi\rangle$ together with her half of the entangled state and tells Bob the results. Using Alice's results Bob operates on his half of the entangled state to make it equal to $|\Psi\rangle$. Since Alice's measurement necessarily erases the quantum state of the system in her lab, the state $|\Psi\rangle$ is not copied, but transferred: it is said to be "teleported" to Bob's laboratory through this protocol.

Entanglement of states from independent sources can be swapped through Bell state measurement.

Entanglement swapping is variant of teleportation that allows two parties that have never interacted to share an entangled state. The swapping protocol begins with two EPR sources. One source emits an entangled pair of particles A and B, while the other emits a second entangled pair of particles C and D. Particles B and C are subjected to a measurement in the basis of Bell states. The state of the remaining particles, A and D, collapses to a Bell state, leaving them entangled despite never having interacted with each other.

An interaction between a qubit of A and a qubit of B can be realized by first teleporting A's qubit to B, then letting it interact with B's qubit (which is now a LOCC operation, since both qubits are in B's lab) and then teleporting the qubit back to A. Two maximally entangled states of two qubits are used up in this process. Thus entangled states are a resource that enables the realization of quantum interactions (or of quantum channels) in a setting where only LOCC are available, but they are consumed in the process. There are other applications where entanglement can be seen as a resource, e.g., private communication or distinguishing quantum states.

=== Multipartite entanglement ===
Quantum states describing systems made of more than two pieces can also be entangled. An example for a three-qubit system is the Greenberger–Horne–Zeilinger (GHZ) state,
$$|\mathrm{GHZ}\rangle = \frac{|000\rangle + |111\rangle}{\sqrt{2}}.$$
Another three-qubit example is the W state:
$$|\mathrm{W}\rangle = \frac{|001\rangle + |010\rangle + |100\rangle}{\sqrt{3}}.$$
Tracing out any one of the three qubits turns the GHZ state into a separable state, whereas the result of tracing over any of the three qubits in the W state is still entangled. This illustrates how multipartite entanglement is a more complicated topic than bipartite entanglement: systems composed of three or more parts can exhibit multiple qualitatively different types of entanglement. A single particle cannot be maximally entangled with more than a particle at a time, a property called monogamy.

=== Classification of entanglement ===
Not all quantum states are equally valuable as a resource. One method to quantify this value is to use an entanglement measure that assigns a numerical value to each quantum state. However, it is often interesting to settle for a coarser way to compare quantum states. This gives rise to different classification schemes. Most entanglement classes are defined based on whether states can be converted to other states using LOCC or a subclass of these operations. The smaller the set of allowed operations, the finer the classification. Important examples are:

- If two states can be transformed into each other by a local unitary operation, they are said to be in the same LU class. This is the finest of the usually considered classes. Two states in the same LU class have the same value for entanglement measures and the same value as a resource in the distant-labs setting. There is an infinite number of different LU classes (even in the simplest case of two qubits in a pure state).
- If two states can be transformed into each other by local operations including measurements with probability larger than 0, they are said to be in the same 'SLOCC class' ("stochastic LOCC"). Qualitatively, two states $\rho_1$ and $\rho_2$ in the same SLOCC class are equally powerful, since one can transform each into the other, but since the transformations $\rho_1\to\rho_2$ and $\rho_2\to\rho_1$ may succeed with different probability, they are no longer equally valuable. E.g., for two pure qubits there are only two SLOCC classes: the entangled states (which contains both the (maximally entangled) Bell states and weakly entangled states like $|00\rangle+0.01|11\rangle$) and the separable ones (i.e., product states like $|00\rangle$).
- Instead of considering transformations of single copies of a state (like $\rho_1\to\rho_2$) one can define classes based on the possibility of multi-copy transformations. E.g., there are examples when $\rho_1\to\rho_2$ is impossible by LOCC, but $\rho_1\otimes\rho_1\to\rho_2$ is possible. A very important (and very coarse) classification is based on the property whether it is possible to transform an arbitrarily large number of copies of a state $\rho$ into at least one pure entangled state. States that have this property are called distillable. These states are the most useful quantum states since, given enough of them, they can be transformed (with local operations) into any entangled state and hence allow for all possible uses. It came initially as a surprise that not all entangled states are distillable; those that are not are called "bound entangled".

A different entanglement classification is based on what the quantum correlations present in a state allow A and B to do: one distinguishes three subsets of entangled states: (1) the non-local states, which produce correlations that cannot be explained by a local hidden variable model and thus violate a Bell inequality, (2) the steerable states that contain sufficient correlations for A to modify ("steer") by local measurements the conditional reduced state of B in such a way, that A can prove to B that the state they possess is indeed entangled, and finally (3) those entangled states that are neither non-local nor steerable. All three sets are non-empty.

=== Entropy ===
In this section, the entropy of a mixed state is discussed as well as how it can be viewed as a measure of quantum entanglement.

==== Definition ====
In classical information theory H, the Shannon entropy, is associated to a probability distribution, $p_1, \cdots, p_n$, in the following way:

$$H(p_1, \cdots, p_n ) = - \sum_i p_i \log_2 p_i.$$

Since a mixed state ρ is a probability distribution over an ensemble, this leads naturally to the definition of the von Neumann entropy:

$$S(\rho) = - \hbox{Tr} \left( \rho \log_2 {\rho} \right),$$

which can be expressed in terms of the eigenvalues of ρ:

$$S(\rho) = - \hbox{Tr} \left( \rho \log_2 {\rho} \right) = - \sum_i \lambda_i \log_2 \lambda_i$$.

Since an event of probability 0 should not contribute to the entropy, and given that

$$\lim_{p \to 0} p \log p = 0,$$

the convention 0 log(0) = 0 is adopted. When a pair of particles is described by the spin singlet state discussed above, the von Neumann entropy of either particle is log(2), which can be shown to be the maximum entropy for 2 × 2 mixed states.

==== As a measure of entanglement ====
Entropy provides one tool that can be used to quantify entanglement, although other entanglement measures exist. If the overall system is pure, the entropy of one subsystem can be used to measure its degree of entanglement with the other subsystems. For bipartite pure states, the von Neumann entropy of reduced states is the unique measure of entanglement in the sense that it is the only function on the family of states that satisfies certain axioms required of an entanglement measure. It is a classical result that the Shannon entropy achieves its maximum at, and only at, the uniform probability distribution {1/n, ..., 1/n}. Therefore, a bipartite pure state ρ ∈ H_{A} ⊗ H_{B} is said to be a maximally entangled state if the reduced state of each subsystem of ρ is the diagonal matrix

$$\begin{bmatrix} \frac{1}{n}& & \\ & \ddots & \\ & & \frac{1}{n}\end{bmatrix}.$$

For mixed states, the reduced von Neumann entropy is not the only reasonable entanglement measure. Rényi entropy can be used as a measure of entanglement.

=== Entanglement measures ===
Entanglement measures quantify the amount of entanglement in a (often viewed as a bipartite) quantum state. As aforementioned, entanglement entropy is the standard measure of entanglement for pure states (but no longer a measure of entanglement for mixed states). For mixed states, there are some entanglement measures in the literature and no single one is standard.

- Entanglement cost
- Distillable entanglement
- Entanglement of formation
- Concurrence
- Relative entropy of entanglement
- Squashed entanglement
- Logarithmic negativity

Most (but not all) of these entanglement measures reduce for pure states to entanglement entropy, and are difficult (NP-hard) to compute for mixed states as the dimension of the entangled system grows.

=== Quantum field theory ===
The Reeh–Schlieder theorem of quantum field theory is sometimes interpreted as saying that entanglement is omnipresent in the quantum vacuum.

== Applications ==
Entanglement has many applications in quantum information theory. With the aid of entanglement, otherwise impossible tasks may be achieved. Among the best-known applications of entanglement are superdense coding and quantum teleportation. Most researchers believe that entanglement is necessary to realize quantum computing (although this is disputed by some). Entanglement is used in some protocols of quantum cryptography, but to prove the security of quantum key distribution (QKD) under standard assumptions does not require entanglement; however, the device independent security of QKD is shown exploiting entanglement between the communication partners. In August 2014, Brazilian researcher Gabriela Barreto Lemos, from the University of Vienna, and team were able to "take pictures" of objects using photons that had not interacted with the subjects, but were entangled with photons that did interact with such objects. The idea has been adapted to make infrared images using only standard cameras that are insensitive to infrared.

=== Entangled states ===
There are several canonical entangled states that appear often in theory and experiments.

For two qubits, the Bell states are

$$|\Phi^\pm\rangle = \frac{1}{\sqrt{2}} (|0\rangle_A \otimes |0\rangle_B \pm |1\rangle_A \otimes |1\rangle_B)$$
$$|\Psi^\pm\rangle = \frac{1}{\sqrt{2}} (|0\rangle_A \otimes |1\rangle_B \pm |1\rangle_A \otimes |0\rangle_B).$$

These four pure states are all maximally entangled and form an orthonormal basis of the Hilbert space of the two qubits. They provide examples of how quantum mechanics can violate Bell-type inequalities.

For M > 2 qubits, the GHZ state is

$$|\mathrm{GHZ}\rangle = \frac{|0\rangle^{\otimes M} + |1\rangle^{\otimes M}}{\sqrt{2}},$$

which reduces to the Bell state $|\Phi^+\rangle$ for M = 2. The traditional GHZ state was defined for M = 3. GHZ states are occasionally extended to qudits, i.e., systems of d rather than 2 dimensions. Also for M > 2 qubits, there are spin squeezed states, a class of squeezed coherent states satisfying certain restrictions on the uncertainty of spin measurements, which are necessarily entangled. Spin squeezed states are good candidates for enhancing precision measurements using quantum entanglement.

For two bosonic modes, a NOON state is

$$|\psi_\text{NOON} \rangle = \frac{|N \rangle_a |0\rangle_b + |{0}\rangle_a |{N}\rangle_b}{\sqrt{2}}.$$

This is like the Bell state $|\Psi^+\rangle$ except the basis states $|0\rangle$ and $|1\rangle$ have been replaced with "the N photons are in one mode" and "the N photons are in the other mode". Finally, there also exist twin Fock states for bosonic modes, which can be created by feeding a Fock state into two arms leading to a beam splitter. They are the sum of multiple NOON states, and can be used to achieve the Heisenberg limit. For the appropriately chosen measures of entanglement, Bell, GHZ, and NOON states are maximally entangled while spin squeezed and twin Fock states are only partially entangled.

=== Methods of creating entanglement ===
Entanglement is usually created by direct interactions between subatomic particles. These interactions can take numerous forms. One of the most commonly used methods is spontaneous parametric down-conversion to generate a pair of photons entangled in polarization. Other methods include the use of a fiber coupler to confine and mix photons, photons emitted from decay cascade of the bi-exciton in a quantum dot, or the use of the Hong–Ou–Mandel effect. Quantum entanglement of a particle and its antiparticle, such as an electron and a positron, can be created by partial overlap of the corresponding quantum wave functions in Hardy's interferometer. In the earliest tests of Bell's theorem, the entangled particles were generated using atomic cascades. It is also possible to create entanglement between quantum systems that never directly interacted, through the use of entanglement swapping. Two independently prepared, identical particles may also be entangled if their wave functions merely spatially overlap, at least partially.

=== Testing a system for entanglement ===
A density matrix ρ is called separable if it can be written as a convex sum of product states, namely
$${\rho=\sum_j p_j \rho_j^{(A)}\otimes\rho_j^{(B)}}$$
with $0\le p_j\le 1$ probabilities. By definition, a state is entangled if it is not separable.

For 2-qubit and qubit-qutrit systems (2 × 2 and 2 × 3 respectively) the simple Peres–Horodecki criterion provides both a necessary and a sufficient criterion for separability, and thus—inadvertently—for detecting entanglement. However, for the general case, the criterion is merely a necessary one for separability, as the problem becomes NP-hard when generalized. Other separability criteria include (but not limited to) the range criterion, reduction criterion, and those based on uncertainty relations. See Ref. for a review of separability criteria in discrete-variable systems and Ref. for a review on techniques and challenges in experimental entanglement certification in discrete-variable systems.

A numerical approach to the problem is suggested by Jon Magne Leinaas, Jan Myrheim and Eirik Ovrum in their paper "Geometrical aspects of entanglement". Leinaas et al. offer a numerical approach, iteratively refining an estimated separable state towards the target state to be tested, and checking if the target state can indeed be reached. In continuous variable systems, the Peres–Horodecki criterion also applies. Specifically, Simon formulated a particular version of the Peres–Horodecki criterion in terms of the second-order moments of canonical operators and showed that it is necessary and sufficient for $1\oplus1$-mode Gaussian states (see Ref. for a seemingly different but essentially equivalent approach). It was later found that Simon's condition is also necessary and sufficient for $1\oplus n$-mode Gaussian states, but no longer sufficient for $2\oplus2$-mode Gaussian states. Simon's condition can be generalized by taking into account the higher order moments of canonical operators or by using entropic measures.

=== In quantum gravity ===
There is a fundamental conflict, referred to as the problem of time, between the way the concept of time is used in quantum mechanics, and the role it plays in general relativity. In standard quantum theories time acts as an independent background through which states evolve, while general relativity treats time as a dynamical variable which relates directly with matter. Part of the effort to reconcile these approaches to time results in the Wheeler–DeWitt equation, which predicts the state of the universe is timeless or static, contrary to ordinary experience. Work started by Don Page and William Wootters suggests that the universe appears to evolve for observers on the inside because of energy entanglement between an evolving system and a clock system, both within the universe. In this way the overall system can remain timeless while parts experience time via entanglement. The issue remains an open question closely related to attempts at theories of quantum gravity.

In general relativity, gravity arises from the curvature of spacetime and that curvature derives from the distribution of matter. However, matter is governed by quantum mechanics. Integration of these two theories faces many problems. In an (unrealistic) model space called the anti-de Sitter space, the AdS/CFT correspondence allows a quantum gravitational system to be related to a quantum field theory without gravity. Using this correspondence, Mark Van Raamsdonk suggested that spacetime arises as an emergent phenomenon of the quantum degrees of freedom that are entangled and live in the boundary of the spacetime.

== Experiments demonstrating and using entanglement ==
=== Bell tests ===
A Bell test, also known as Bell inequality test or Bell experiment, is a real-world physics experiment designed to test the theory of quantum mechanics against the hypothesis of local hidden variables. These tests empirically evaluate the implications of Bell's theorem. To date, all Bell tests have found that the hypothesis of local hidden variables is inconsistent with the way that physical systems behave. Many types of Bell tests have been performed in physics laboratories, often with the goal of ameliorating problems of experimental design or set-up that could in principle affect the validity of the findings of earlier Bell tests. This is known as "closing loopholes in Bell tests". In earlier tests, it could not be ruled out that the result at one point could have been subtly transmitted to the remote point, affecting the outcome at the second location; however, "loophole-free" Bell tests have since been performed where the locations were sufficiently separated that communications at the speed of light would have taken longer—in one case, 10,000 times longer—than the interval between the measurements.

In 2017, Yin et al. reported setting a new quantum entanglement distance record of 1,203 km, demonstrating the survival of a two-photon pair and a violation of a Bell inequality, reaching a CHSH valuation of 2.37±0.09, under strict Einstein locality conditions, from the Micius satellite to bases in Lijian, Yunnan and Delingha, Qinghai, increasing the efficiency of transmission over prior fiberoptic experiments by an order of magnitude.

=== Entanglement of top quarks ===
In 2023 the LHC using techniques from quantum tomography measured entanglement at the highest energy so far, a rare intersection between quantum information and high energy physics based on theoretical work first proposed in 2021. The experiment was carried by the ATLAS detector measuring the spin of top-quark pair production and the effect was observed with a more than 5σ level of significance, the top quark is the heaviest known particle and therefore has a very short lifetime ($\tau$ ≈ 10^{−25} s) being the only quark that decays before undergoing hadronization (~ 10^{−23} s) and spin decorrelation (~ 10^{−21} s), so the spin information is transferred without much loss to the leptonic decays products that will be caught by the detector. The spin polarization and correlation of the particles was measured and tested for entanglement with concurrence as well as the Peres–Horodecki criterion and subsequently the effect has been confirmed too in the CMS detector.

=== Entanglement of macroscopic objects ===
In 2020, researchers reported the quantum entanglement between the motion of a millimetre-sized mechanical oscillator and a disparate distant spin system of a cloud of atoms. Later work complemented this work by quantum-entangling two mechanical oscillators.

=== Entanglement of quarks and gluons in protons ===
Physicists at Brookhaven National Laboratory demonstrated quantum entanglement within protons, showing quarks and gluons are interdependent rather than isolated particles. Using high-energy electron-proton collisions, they revealed maximal entanglement, reshaping our understanding of proton structure.

== See also ==
- Concurrence
- CNOT gate
- Einstein's thought experiments
- Entanglement witness
- ER = EPR
- Multipartite entanglement
- Normally distributed and uncorrelated does not imply independent
- Pauli exclusion principle
- Quantum coherence
- Quantum discord
- Quantum network
- Quantum phase transition
- Quantum pseudo-telepathy
- Retrocausality
- Squashed entanglement
- Stern–Gerlach experiment
- Ward's probability amplitude
