= Reeh–Schlieder theorem =

Theorem in axiomatic quantum field theory

The Reeh–Schlieder theorem is a result in relativistic local quantum field theory published by Helmut Reeh and Siegfried Schlieder in 1961.

The theorem states that the vacuum state $\vert \Omega \rangle$ is a cyclic vector for the field algebra $\mathcal{A}(\mathcal{O})$ corresponding to any open set $\mathcal{O}$ in Minkowski space. That is, any state $\vert \psi \rangle$ can be approximated to arbitrary precision by acting on the vacuum with an operator selected from the local algebra, even for $\vert \psi \rangle$ that contain excitations arbitrarily far away in space. In this sense, states created by applying elements of the local algebra to the vacuum state are not localized to the region $\mathcal{O}$.

For practical purposes, however, local operators still generate quasi-local states. More precisely, the long range effects of the operators of the local algebra will diminish rapidly with distance, as seen by the cluster properties of the Wightman functions. And with increasing distance, creating a unit vector localized outside the region requires operators of ever increasing operator norm.

This theorem is also cited in connection with quantum entanglement. But it is subject to some doubt whether the Reeh–Schlieder theorem can usefully be seen as the quantum field theory analog to quantum entanglement, since the exponentially-increasing energy needed for long range actions will prohibit any macroscopic effects. However, Benni Reznik showed that vacuum entanglement can be distilled into EPR pairs used in quantum information tasks.

It is known that the Reeh–Schlieder property applies not just to the vacuum but in fact to any state with bounded energy. If some finite number N of space-like separated regions is chosen, the multipartite entanglement can be analyzed in the typical quantum information setting of N abstract quantum systems, each with a Hilbert space possessing a countable basis, and the corresponding structure has been called superentanglement.

== See also ==
- Newton–Wigner localization
