= Squashed entanglement =

Squashed entanglement, also called CMI entanglement (CMI can be pronounced "see me"), is an information theoretic measure of quantum entanglement for a bipartite quantum system. If $\varrho_{A, B}$ is the density matrix of a system $(A,B)$ composed of two subsystems $A$ and $B$, then the CMI entanglement $E_{CMI}$ of system $(A,B)$ is defined by

$E_{CMI}(\varrho_{A, B}) = \frac{1}{2}\min_{\varrho_{A,B,\Lambda}\in K}S(A:B | \Lambda)$,	Eq.(1)

where $K$ is the set of all density matrices $\varrho_{A, B, \Lambda}$ for a tripartite system $(A,B,\Lambda)$ such that $\varrho_{A, B}=tr_\Lambda (\varrho_{A, B, \Lambda})$. Thus, CMI entanglement is defined as an extremum of a functional $S(A:B | \Lambda)$ of $\varrho_{A, B, \Lambda}$. We define $S(A:B | \Lambda)$, the quantum Conditional Mutual Information (CMI), below. A more general version of Eq.(1) replaces the "min" (minimum) in Eq.(1) by an "inf" (infimum). When $\varrho_{A, B}$ is a pure state, $E_{CMI}(\varrho_{A, B})=S(\varrho_{A})=S(\varrho_{B})$, in agreement with the definition of entanglement of formation for pure states. Here $S(\varrho)$ is the Von Neumann entropy of density matrix $\varrho$.

== Motivation for definition of CMI entanglement ==
CMI entanglement has its roots in classical (non-quantum) information theory, as we explain next.

Given any two random variables $A,B$, classical information theory defines the mutual information, a measure of correlations, as

$H(A:B) =H(A) + H(B) - H(A, B)\,$.	Eq.(2)

For three random variables $A,B,\Lambda$, it defines the CMI as

$$\begin{matrix} H(A : B | \Lambda)&=& H(A|\Lambda)+ H(B | \Lambda)- H(A, B | \Lambda)\\ &=&H(A, \Lambda)+H(B, \Lambda)-H(\Lambda)-H(A, B, \Lambda) \end{matrix}$$.	Eq.(3)

It can be shown that $H(A : B | \Lambda)\geq 0$.

Now suppose $\varrho_{A, B, \Lambda}$ is the density matrix for a tripartite system $(A,B,\Lambda)$. We will represent the partial trace of $\varrho_{A, B, \Lambda}$ with respect to one or two of its subsystems by $\varrho_{A, B, \Lambda}$ with the symbol for the traced system erased. For example, $\varrho_{A, B}= tr_\Lambda(\varrho_{A, B, \Lambda})$. One can define a quantum analogue of Eq.(2) by

$S(A:B) = S(\varrho_{A}) + S(\varrho_{B}) -S(\varrho_{A, B}) \,$,	Eq.(4)

and a quantum analogue of Eq.(3) by

$S(A:B|\Lambda) = S(\varrho_{A, \Lambda}) +S(\varrho_{B, \Lambda}) -S(\varrho_\Lambda) -S(\varrho_{A, B, \Lambda}) \,$.	Eq.(5)

It can be shown that $S(A : B | \Lambda)\geq 0$. This inequality is often called the strong-subadditivity property of quantum entropy.

Consider three random variables $A,B, \Lambda$ with probability distribution $P_{A,B,\Lambda}(a,b, \lambda)$, which we will abbreviate as $P(a,b, \lambda)$. For those special $P(a, b, \lambda)$ of the form

$P(a, b, \lambda) = P(a| \lambda) P(b | \lambda) P(\lambda)\,$,	Eq.(6)

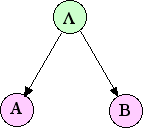
Fig.1: Bayesian Network representation of Eq.(6)

it can be shown that $H(A: B |\Lambda)=0$. Probability distributions of the form Eq.(6) are in fact described by the Bayesian network shown in Fig.1.

One can define a classical CMI entanglement by

$E_{CMI}( P_{A,B}) = \min_{P_{A, B, \Lambda}\in K} H(A: B |\Lambda)$,	Eq.(7)

where $K$ is the set of all probability distributions $P_{A,B,\Lambda}$ in three random variables $A,B,\Lambda$, such that $\sum_\lambda P_{A,B,\Lambda}(a, b,\lambda)=P_{A,B}(a,b)\,$for all $a,b$. Because, given a probability distribution $P_{A,B}$, one can always extend it to a probability distribution $P_{A,B, \Lambda}$ that satisfies Eq.(6), it follows that the classical CMI entanglement, $E_{CMI}( P_{A,B})$, is zero for all $P_{A,B}$. The fact that $E_{CMI}( P_{A,B})$ always vanishes is an important motivation for the definition of $E_{CMI}( \varrho_{A,B})$. We want a measure of quantum entanglement that vanishes in the classical regime.

Suppose $w_\lambda$ for $\lambda=1,2,...,dim(\Lambda)$ is a set of non-negative numbers that add up to one, and $|\lambda\rangle$ for $\lambda=1,2,...,dim(\Lambda)$ is an orthonormal basis for the Hilbert space associated with a quantum system $\Lambda$. Suppose $\varrho_A^\lambda$ and $\varrho_B^\lambda$, for $\lambda=1,2,...,dim(\Lambda)$ are density matrices for the systems $A$ and $B$, respectively. It can be shown that the following density matrix

$\varrho_{A, B, \Lambda}=\sum_\lambda \varrho_A^\lambda \varrho_B^\lambda w_\lambda |\lambda\rangle\langle\lambda| \,$	Eq.(8)

satisfies $S(A: B |\Lambda)=0$. Eq.(8) is the quantum counterpart of Eq.(6). Tracing the density matrix of Eq.(8) over $\Lambda$, we get $\varrho_{A,B} = \sum_\lambda \varrho_A^\lambda \varrho_B^\lambda w_\lambda \,$, which is a separable state. Therefore, $E_{CMI}(\varrho_{A, B})$ given by Eq.(1) vanishes for all separable states.

When $\varrho_{A, B}$ is a pure state, one gets $E_{CMI}(\varrho_{A, B})=S(\varrho_{A})=S(\varrho_{B})$. This agrees with the definition of entanglement of formation for pure states, as given in Ben96.

Next suppose $|\psi_{A,B}^\lambda\rangle$ for $\lambda=1,2,...,dim(\Lambda)$ are some states in the Hilbert space associated with a quantum system $(A,B)$. Let $K$ be the set of density matrices defined previously for Eq.(1). Define $K_o$ to be the set of all density matrices $\varrho_{A, B, \Lambda}$ that are elements of $K$ and have the special form $\varrho_{A, B, \Lambda} = \sum_\lambda|\psi_{A,B}^\lambda\rangle \langle \psi_{A,B}^\lambda| w_\lambda |\lambda\rangle\langle\lambda|\,$. It can be shown that if we replace in Eq.(1) the set $K$ by its proper subset $K_o$, then Eq.(1) reduces to the definition of entanglement of formation for mixed states, as given in Ben96. $K$ and $K_o$ represent different degrees of knowledge as to how $\varrho_{A, B, \Lambda}$ was created. $K$ represents total ignorance.

Since CMI entanglement reduces to entanglement of formation if one minimizes over $K_o$ instead of $K$, one expects that CMI entanglement inherits many desirable properties from entanglement of formation.

== History ==
The important inequality $S(A : B | \Lambda)\geq 0$ was first proved by Lieb and Ruskai in LR73.

Classical CMI, given by Eq.(3), first entered information theory lore, shortly after Shannon's seminal 1948 paper and at least as early as 1954 in McG54. The quantum CMI, given by Eq.(5), was first defined by Cerf and Adami in Cer96. However, it appears that Cerf and Adami did not realize the relation of CMI to entanglement or the possibility of obtaining a measure of quantum entanglement based on CMI; this can be inferred, for example, from a later paper, Cer97, where they try to use $S(A|B)$ instead of CMI to understand entanglement. The first paper to explicitly point out a connection between CMI and quantum entanglement appears to be Tuc99.

The final definition Eq.(1) of CMI entanglement was first given by Tucci in a series of 6 papers. (See, for example, Eq.(8) of Tuc02 and Eq.(42) of Tuc01a). In Tuc00b, he pointed out the classical probability motivation of Eq.(1), and its connection to the definitions of entanglement of formation for pure and mixed states. In Tuc01a, he presented an algorithm and computer program, based on the Arimoto-Blahut method of information theory, for calculating CMI entanglement numerically. In Tuc01b, he calculated CMI entanglement analytically, for a mixed state of two qubits.

In Hay03, Hayden, Jozsa, Petz and Winter explored the connection between quantum CMI and separability.

It was not however, until Chr03, that it was shown that CMI entanglement is in fact an entanglement measure, i.e. that it does not increase under Local Operations and Classical Communication (LOCC). The proof adapted Ben96 arguments about entanglement of formation. In Chr03, they also proved many other interesting inequalities concerning CMI entanglement, including that it was additive, and explored its connection to other measures of entanglement. The name squashed entanglement first appeared in Chr03. In Chr05, Christandl and Winter calculated analytically the CMI entanglement of some interesting states.

In Ali03, Alicki and Fannes proved the continuity of CMI entanglement. In BCY10, Brandao, Christandl and Yard showed that CMI entanglement is zero if and only if the state is separable. In Hua14, Huang proved that computing squashed entanglement is NP-hard.
