= Unextendible product basis =

In quantum mechanics, an unextendible product basis is a set of orthogonal, non-entangled state vectors for a multipartite system, with the property that local operations and classical communication are insufficient to distinguish one member of the set from the others. Because these states are product states and yet local measurements cannot tell them apart, they are sometimes said to exhibit "nonlocality without entanglement". They provide examples of non-entangled states that pass the Peres–Horodecki criterion for entanglement.

== See also ==
- Bound entanglement
