= Monogamy of entanglement =

Principle in quantum information science

In quantum physics, monogamy is the property of quantum entanglement that restricts entanglement from being freely shared between arbitrarily many parties.

In order for two qubits A and B to be maximally entangled, they must not be entangled with any third qubit C whatsoever. Even if A and B are not maximally entangled, the degree of entanglement between them constrains the degree to which either can be entangled with C. In full generality, for $n \geq 3$ qubits $A_1, \ldots, A_n$, monogamy is characterized by the Coffman–Kundu–Wootters (CKW) inequality, which states that

$$\sum_{k=2}^{n} \tau(\rho_{A_1A_k}) \leq \tau(\rho_{A_1(A_2{\ldots}A_n)})$$

where $\rho_{A_{1}A_k}$ is the density matrix of the substate consisting of qubits $A_1$ and $A_k$ and $\tau$ is the "tangle", a quantification of bipartite entanglement equal to the square of the concurrence.

Monogamy, which is closely related to the no-cloning property, is purely a feature of quantum correlations, and has no classical analogue. Supposing that two classical random variables X and Y are correlated, we can copy, or "clone", X to create arbitrarily many random variables that all share precisely the same correlation with Y. If we let X and Y be entangled quantum states instead, then X cannot be cloned, and this sort of "polygamous" outcome is impossible.

The monogamy of entanglement has broad implications for applications of quantum mechanics ranging from black hole physics to quantum cryptography, where it plays a pivotal role in the security of quantum key distribution.

== Proof ==
The monogamy of bipartite entanglement was established for tripartite systems in terms of concurrence by Valerie Coffman, Joydip Kundu, and William Wootters in 2000. In 2006, Tobias Osborne and Frank Verstraete extended this result to the multipartite case, proving the CKW inequality.

== Example ==
For the sake of illustration, consider the three-qubit state $|\psi\rangle \in (\mathbb{C}^2)^{\otimes 3}$ consisting of qubits A, B, and C. Suppose that A and B form a (maximally entangled) EPR pair, e.g.

$|\text{EPR} \rangle_{AB}=\frac{(|00\rangle + |11\rangle)}{\sqrt{2} }$

We will show that:

$$|\psi\rangle = |\text{EPR} \rangle_{AB} \otimes |\phi\rangle_C$$

for some valid quantum state $|\phi\rangle_C$. By the definition of entanglement, this implies that C must be completely disentangled from A and B.

When measured in the standard basis, A and B collapse to the states $|00\rangle$ and $|11\rangle$ with probability $\frac{1}{2}$ each. It follows that:

$$|\psi\rangle = |00\rangle \otimes (\alpha_{0}|0\rangle + \alpha_{1}|1\rangle) + |11\rangle \otimes (\beta_0|0\rangle + \beta_1|1\rangle)$$

for some $\alpha_0, \alpha_1, \beta_0, \beta_1 \in \mathbb{C}$ such that $|\alpha_0|^2 + |\alpha_1|^2 = |\beta_0|^2 + |\beta_1|^2 = \frac{1}{2}$.

By defining diagonal basis vectors $|+\rangle$ and $|-\rangle$ such that:

$$|0\rangle = \frac{1}{\sqrt 2}(|+\rangle + |-\rangle)$$

$$|1\rangle = \frac{1}{\sqrt 2}(|+\rangle - |-\rangle)$$

we can rewrite the states of A and B in terms of $|++\rangle$, $|+-\rangle$, $|-+\rangle$, and $|--\rangle$ as:

$$|\psi\rangle = \frac{1}{2}(|++\rangle + |+-\rangle + |-+\rangle + |--\rangle) \otimes (\alpha_{0}|0\rangle + \alpha_{1}|1\rangle) + \frac{1}{2}(|++\rangle - |+-\rangle - |-+\rangle + |--\rangle) \otimes (\beta_0|0\rangle + \beta_1|1\rangle)$$
$$= \frac{1}{2}(|++\rangle + |--\rangle) \otimes ((\alpha_0 + \beta_0)|0\rangle + (\alpha_1 + \beta_1)|1\rangle) + \frac{1}{2}(|+-\rangle + |-+\rangle) \otimes ((\alpha_0 - \beta_0)|0\rangle + (\alpha_1 - \beta_1)|1\rangle)$$

Being maximally entangled, A and B collapse to one of the two states $|++\rangle$ or $|--\rangle$ when measured in the diagonal basis. The probability of observing outcomes $|+-\rangle$ or $|-+\rangle$ is zero. Therefore, according to the equation above, it must be the case that $\alpha_0 - \beta_0 = 0$ and $\alpha_1 - \beta_1 = 0$. It follows immediately that $\alpha_0 = \beta_0$ and $\alpha_1 = \beta_1$. We can rewrite our expression for $|\psi\rangle$ accordingly:

$$|\psi\rangle = (|++\rangle + |--\rangle) \otimes (\alpha_0|0\rangle + \alpha_1|1\rangle)$$
$$= |\text{EPR}\rangle_{AB} \otimes (\sqrt{2}\alpha_0|0\rangle + \sqrt{2}\alpha_1|1\rangle)$$
$$= |\text{EPR}\rangle_{AB} \otimes |\phi\rangle_C$$

This shows that the original state can be written as a product of a pure state in AB and a pure state in C, which means that the EPR state in qubits A and B is not entangled with the qubit C.
