= Entanglement of formation =

Definition in quantum information theory

The entanglement of formation is a quantity that measures the entanglement of a bipartite quantum state.

== Definition ==
For a pure bipartite quantum state $|\psi\rangle_{AB}$, using Schmidt decomposition, we see that the reduced density matrices of systems A and B, $\rho_A$ and $\rho_B$, have the same spectrum. The von Neumann entropy $S(\rho_A)=S(\rho_B)$ of the reduced density matrix can be used to measure the entanglement of the state $|\psi\rangle_{AB}$. We denote this kind of measure as $E_{f}(|\psi\rangle_{AB})=S(\rho_A)=S(\rho_B)$, and call it the entanglement entropy. This is also known as the entanglement of formation of a pure state.

For a mixed bipartite state $\rho_{AB}$, a natural generalization is to consider all the ensemble realizations of the mixed state. We define the entanglement of formation for mixed states by minimizing over all these ensemble realizations,

$E_f (\rho_{AB})= \inf\left\{ \sum_i p_i E_f(|\psi_i\rangle_{AB})\right\}$, where the infimum is taken over all the possible ways in which one can decompose $\rho_{AB}$ into pure states $\rho_{AB}=\sum_i p_i |\psi_i \rangle \langle \psi_i|_{AB}$.

This kind of extension of a quantity defined on some set (here the pure states) to its convex hull (here the mixed states) is called a convex roof construction.

== Properties ==
Entanglement of formation quantifies how much entanglement (measured in ebits) is necessary, on average, to prepare the state. The measure clearly coincides with entanglement entropy for pure states. It is zero for all separable states and non-zero for all entangled states. By construction, $E_f$ is convex.

Entanglement of formation is known to be a non-additive measure of entanglement. That is, there are bipartite quantum states $\rho_{AB}, \sigma_{AB}$ such that the entanglement of formation of the joint state $\rho_{AB}\otimes\sigma_{AB}$ is smaller than the sum of the individual states' entanglement, i. e., $E_f(\rho_{AB}\otimes\sigma_{AB}) < E_f(\rho_{AB})+E_f(\sigma_{AB})$. Note that for other states (for example pure or separable states) equality holds.

Furthermore, it has been shown that the regularized entanglement of formation equals the entanglement cost. That is, for large $n$ the entanglement of formation of $n$ copies of a state $\rho$ divided by $n$ converges to the entanglement cost

$$\lim_{n\to\infty} E_f(\rho^{\otimes n})/n = E_c(\rho)$$

The non-additivity of $E_f$ thus implies that there are quantum states for which there is a “bulk discount” when preparing them from pure states by local operations: it is cheaper, on average, to prepare many together than each one separately.

== Relation with concurrence ==
For states of two qubits, the entanglement of formation has a close relationship with concurrence. For a given state $\rho_{AB}$, its entanglement of formation $E_f (\rho_{AB})$ is related to its concurrence $C$:

$$E_f=h\left(\frac{1+\sqrt{1-C^2}}{2}\right)$$

where $h(x)$ is the Shannon entropy function,

$$h(x) = -x \log_2 x -(1-x) \log_2 (1-x).$$
