= Range criterion =

In quantum mechanics, in particular quantum information, the Range criterion is a necessary condition that a state must satisfy in order to be separable. In other words, it is a separability criterion.

== The result ==
Consider a quantum mechanical system composed of n subsystems. The state space H of such a system is the tensor product of those of the subsystems, i.e. $H = H_1 \otimes \cdots \otimes H_n$.

For simplicity we will assume throughout that all relevant state spaces are finite-dimensional.

The criterion reads as follows: If ρ is a separable mixed state acting on H, then the range of ρ is spanned by a set of product vectors.

=== Proof ===
In general, if a matrix M is of the form $M = \sum_i v_i v_i^*$, the range of M, Ran(M), is contained in the linear span of $\; \{ v_i \}$. On the other hand, we can also show $v_i$ lies in Ran(M), for all i. Assume without loss of generality i = 1. We can write $M = v_1 v_1 ^* + T$, where T is Hermitian and positive semidefinite. There are two possibilities:

1) span$\{ v_1 \} \subset$Ker(T). Clearly, in this case, $v_1 \in$ Ran(M).

2) Notice 1) is true if and only if Ker(T)$\;^{\perp} \subset$ span$\{ v_1 \}^{\perp}$, where $\perp$ denotes orthogonal complement. By Hermiticity of T, this is the same as Ran(T)$\subset$ span$\{ v_1 \}^{\perp}$. So if 1) does not hold, the intersection Ran(T) $\cap$ span$\{ v_1 \}$ is nonempty, i.e. there exists some complex number α such that $\; T w = \alpha v_1$. So

$$M w = \langle w, v_1 \rangle v_1 + T w = ( \langle w, v_1 \rangle + \alpha ) v_1.$$

Therefore $v_1$ lies in Ran(M).

Thus Ran(M) coincides with the linear span of $\; \{ v_i \}$. The range criterion is a special case of this fact.

A density matrix ρ acting on H is separable if and only if it can be written as

$$\rho = \sum_i \psi_{1,i} \psi_{1,i}^* \otimes \cdots \otimes \psi_{n,i} \psi_{n,i}^*$$

where $\psi_{j,i} \psi_{j,i}^*$ is a (un-normalized) pure state on the j-th subsystem. This is also

$$\rho = \sum_i ( \psi_{1,i} \otimes \cdots \otimes \psi_{n,i} ) ( \psi_{1,i} ^* \otimes \cdots \otimes \psi_{n,i} ^* ).$$

But this is exactly the same form as M from above, with the vectorial product state $\psi_{1,i} \otimes \cdots \otimes \psi_{n,i}$ replacing $v_i$. It then immediately follows that the range of ρ is the linear span of these product states. This proves the criterion.
