= Schmidt decomposition =

Process in linear algebra

In linear algebra, the Schmidt decomposition (named after its originator Erhard Schmidt) refers to a particular way of expressing a vector in the tensor product of two inner product spaces. It has numerous applications in quantum information theory, for example in entanglement characterization and in state purification, and plasticity.

== Theorem ==
Let $H_1$ and $H_2$ be Hilbert spaces of dimensions n and m respectively. Assume $n \geq m$. For any vector $w$ in the tensor product $H_1 \otimes H_2$, there exist orthonormal sets $\{ u_1, \ldots, u_m \} \subset H_1$ and $\{ v_1, \ldots, v_m \} \subset H_2$ such that $w= \sum_{i =1} ^m \alpha _i u_i \otimes v_i$, where the scalars $\alpha_i$ are real, non-negative, and unique up to re-ordering.

=== Proof ===
The Schmidt decomposition is essentially a restatement of the singular value decomposition in a different context. Fix orthonormal bases $\{ e_1, \ldots, e_n \} \subset H_1$ and $\{ f_1, \ldots, f_m \} \subset H_2$. We can identify an elementary tensor $e_i \otimes f_j$ with the matrix $e_i f_j ^\mathsf{T}$, where $f_j ^\mathsf{T}$ is the transpose of $f_j$. A general element of the tensor product

$$w = \sum _{1 \leq i \leq n, 1 \leq j \leq m} \beta _{ij} e_i \otimes f_j$$

can then be viewed as the n × m matrix

$$\; M_w = (\beta_{ij}) .$$

By the singular value decomposition, there exist an n × n unitary U, m × m unitary V, and a positive semidefinite diagonal m × m matrix Σ such that

$$M_w = U \begin{bmatrix} \Sigma \\ 0 \end{bmatrix} V^* .$$

Write
$$U =\begin{bmatrix} U_1 & U_2 \end{bmatrix}$$
where $U_1$ is n × m and we have

$$\; M_w = U_1 \Sigma V^* .$$

Let $\{ u_1, \ldots, u_m \}$ be the m column vectors of $U_1$, $\{ v_1, \ldots, v_m \}$ the column vectors of $\overline{V}$, and $\alpha_1, \ldots, \alpha_m$ the diagonal elements of Σ. The previous expression is then

$$M_w = \sum _{k=1} ^m \alpha_k u_k v_k ^\mathsf{T} ,$$

Then

$$w = \sum _{k=1} ^m \alpha_k u_k \otimes v_k ,$$

which proves the claim.

== Some observations ==
Some properties of the Schmidt decomposition are of physical interest.

=== Spectrum of reduced states ===
Consider a vector $w$ of the tensor product

$$H_1 \otimes H_2$$

in the form of Schmidt decomposition

$$w = \sum_{i =1} ^m \alpha _i u_i \otimes v_i.$$

Form the rank 1 matrix $\rho = w w^*$. Then the partial trace of $\rho$, with respect to either system A or B, is a diagonal matrix whose non-zero diagonal elements are $| \alpha_i|^2$. In other words, the Schmidt decomposition shows that the reduced states of $\rho$ on either subsystem have the same spectrum.

=== Schmidt rank and entanglement ===
The strictly positive values $\alpha_i$ in the Schmidt decomposition of $w$ are its Schmidt coefficients, or Schmidt numbers. The total number of Schmidt coefficients of $w$, counted with multiplicity, is called its Schmidt rank.

If $w$ can be expressed as a product

$$u \otimes v$$

then $w$ is called a separable state. Otherwise, $w$ is said to be an entangled state. From the Schmidt decomposition, we can see that $w$ is entangled if and only if $w$ has Schmidt rank strictly greater than 1. Therefore, two subsystems that partition a pure state are entangled if and only if their reduced states are mixed states.

=== Von Neumann entropy ===
A consequence of the above comments is that, for pure states, the von Neumann entropy of the reduced states is a well-defined measure of entanglement. For the von Neumann entropy of both reduced states of $\rho$ is $-\sum_i |\alpha_i|^2 \log\left(|\alpha_i|^2\right)$, and this is zero if and only if $\rho$ is a product state (not entangled).

== Schmidt-rank vector ==
The Schmidt rank is defined for bipartite systems, namely quantum states

$|\psi\rangle \in H_A \otimes H_B$

The concept of Schmidt rank can be extended to quantum systems made up of more than two subsystems.

Consider the tripartite quantum system:

$|\psi\rangle \in H_A \otimes H_B \otimes H_C$

There are three ways to reduce this to a bipartite system by performing the partial trace with respect to $H_A, H_B$ or $H_C$

$$\begin{cases}
\hat{\rho}_A = Tr_A(|\psi\rangle\langle\psi|)\\
\hat{\rho}_B = Tr_B(|\psi\rangle\langle\psi|)\\
\hat{\rho}_C = Tr_C(|\psi\rangle\langle\psi|)
\end{cases}$$

Each of the systems obtained is a bipartite system and therefore can be characterized by one number (its Schmidt rank), respectively $r_A, r_B$ and $r_C$. These numbers capture the "amount of entanglement" in the bipartite system when respectively A, B or C are discarded. For these reasons the tripartite system can be described by a vector, namely the Schmidt-rank vector

$\vec{r} = (r_A, r_B, r_C)$

=== Multipartite systems ===
The concept of Schmidt-rank vector can be likewise extended to systems made up of more than three subsystems through the use of tensors.

=== Example ===
Take the tripartite quantum state $|\psi_{4, 2, 2}\rangle = \frac{1}{2}\big(|0, 0, 0\rangle + |1, 0, 1\rangle + |2, 1, 0\rangle + |3, 1, 1\rangle \big)$

This kind of system is made possible by encoding the value of a qudit into the orbital angular momentum (OAM) of a photon rather than its spin, since the latter can only take two values.

The Schmidt-rank vector for this quantum state is $(4, 2, 2)$.

== See also ==
- Singular value decomposition
- Purification of quantum state
