= Separable state =

Quantum states that are not entangled

In quantum mechanics, separable states are multipartite quantum states that can be written as a convex combination of product states. Product states are multipartite quantum states that can be written as a tensor product of states in each space. The physical intuition behind these definitions is that product states have no correlation between the different degrees of freedom, while separable states might have correlations, but all such correlations can be explained as due to a classical random variable, as opposed to being due to entanglement.

In the special case of pure states the definition simplifies: a pure state is separable if and only if it is a product state.

A state is said to be entangled if it is not separable. In general, determining if a state is separable is not straightforward and the problem is classed as NP-hard.

== Separability of bipartite systems ==
Consider first composite states with two degrees of freedom, referred to as bipartite states. By a postulate of quantum mechanics these can be described as vectors in the tensor product space $H_1\otimes H_2$. In this discussion we will focus on the case of the Hilbert spaces $H_1$ and $H_2$ being finite-dimensional.

=== Pure states ===
Let $\{|{a_i}\rangle\}_{i=1}^n\subset H_1$ and $\{|{b_j}\rangle\}_{j=1}^m \subset H_2$ be orthonormal bases for $H_1$ and $H_2$, respectively. A basis for $H_1 \otimes H_2$ is then $\{|{a_i}\rangle\otimes |{b_j}\rangle\}$, or in more compact notation $\{|a_i b_j \rangle\}$. From the very definition of the tensor product, any vector of norm 1, i.e. a pure state of the composite system, can be written as

$$|\psi\rangle = \sum_{i,j} c_{i,j} (| a_i \rangle \otimes | b_j \rangle) =\sum_{i,j} c_{i,j} | a_i b_j \rangle,$$

where $c_{i,j}$ is a constant. If $|\psi\rangle$ can be written as a simple tensor, that is, in the form $|\psi\rangle = |\psi_1\rangle \otimes |\psi_2\rangle$ with $|\psi _i \rangle$ a pure state in the i-th space, it is said to be a product state, and, in particular, separable. Otherwise it is called entangled. Note that, even though the notions of product and separable states coincide for pure states, they do not in the more general case of mixed states.

Pure states are entangled if and only if their partial states are not pure. To see this, write the Schmidt decomposition of $|\psi\rangle$ as

$$|\psi\rangle=\sum_{k=1}^{r_\psi} \sqrt{p_k} (|u_k\rangle\otimes|v_k\rangle),$$

where $\sqrt{p_k}>0$ are positive real numbers, $r_\psi$ is the Schmidt rank of $|\psi\rangle$, and $\{|u_k\rangle\}_{k=1}^{r_\psi}\subset H_1$ and $\{|v_k\rangle\}_{k=1}^{r_\psi}\subset H_2$ are sets of orthonormal states in $H_1$ and $H_2$, respectively. The state $|\psi\rangle$ is entangled if and only if $r_\psi>1$. At the same time, the partial state has the form

$$\rho_A\equiv \operatorname{Tr}_B(|\psi\rangle\!\langle\psi|) = \sum_{k=1}^{r_\psi} p_k \, |u_k\rangle\!\langle u_k|.$$

It follows that $\rho_A$ is pure --- that is, is projection with unit-rank --- if and only if $r_\psi=1$, which is equivalent to $|\psi\rangle$ being separable.

Physically, this means that it is not possible to assign a definite (pure) state to the subsystems, which instead ought to be described as statistical ensembles of pure states, that is, as density matrices. A pure state $\rho=|\psi\rangle\!\langle\psi|$ is thus entangled if and only if the von Neumann entropy of the partial state $\rho_A\equiv\operatorname{Tr}_B(\rho)$ is nonzero.

Formally, the embedding of a product of states into the product space is given by the Segre embedding. That is, a quantum-mechanical pure state is separable if and only if it is in the image of the Segre embedding.

For example, in a two-qubit space, where $H_1=H_2=\mathbb{C}^2$, the states $|0\rangle\otimes|0\rangle$, $|0\rangle\otimes|1\rangle$, $|1\rangle\otimes|1\rangle$, are all product (and thus separable) pure states, as is $|0\rangle\otimes|\psi\rangle$ with $|\psi\rangle\equiv\sqrt{1/3}|0\rangle+\sqrt{2/3}|1\rangle$. On the other hand, states like $\sqrt{1/2}|00\rangle+\sqrt{1/2}|11\rangle$ or $\sqrt{1/3}|01\rangle+\sqrt{2/3}|10\rangle$ are not separable.

=== Mixed states ===
Consider the mixed state case. A mixed state of the composite system is described by a density matrix $\rho$ acting on $H_1 \otimes H_2$. Such a state $\rho$ is separable if there exist $p_k\geq 0$, $\{ \rho_1^k \}$ and $\{ \rho_2^k \}$ which are mixed states of the respective subsystems such that

$$\rho=\sum_k p_k \rho_1^k \otimes \rho_2^k$$

where

$$\;
\sum_k p_k = 1.$$

Otherwise $\rho$ is called an entangled state. We can assume without loss of generality in the above expression that $\{ \rho_1^k \}$ and $\{ \rho_2^k \}$ are all rank-1 projections, that is, they represent pure ensembles of the appropriate subsystems. It is clear from the definition that the family of separable states is a convex set.

Notice that, again from the definition of the tensor product, any density matrix, indeed any matrix acting on the composite state space, can be trivially written in the desired form, if we drop the requirement that $\{ \rho_1^k \}$ and $\{ \rho_2^k \}$ are themselves states and $\; \sum_k p_k = 1.$ If these requirements are satisfied, then we can interpret the total state as a probability distribution over uncorrelated product states.

In terms of quantum channels, a separable state can be created from any other state using local actions and classical communication while an entangled state cannot.

When the state spaces are infinite-dimensional, density matrices are replaced by positive trace class operators with trace 1, and a state is separable if it can be approximated, in trace norm, by states of the above form.

If there is only a single non-zero $p_k$, then the state can be expressed just as $\rho = \rho_1 \otimes \rho_2 ,$ and is called simply separable or product state. One property of the product state is that in terms of entropy,

$$S(\rho) = S(\rho_1) + S(\rho_2).$$

== Extending to the multipartite case ==
The above discussion generalizes easily to the case of a quantum system consisting of more than two subsystems. Let a system have n subsystems and have state space $H = H_1 \otimes \cdots \otimes H_n$. A pure state $| \psi \rangle \in H$ is separable if it takes the form

$$| \psi \rangle = | \psi_1 \rangle \otimes \cdots \otimes | \psi_n \rangle .$$

Similarly, a mixed state ρ acting on H is separable if it is a convex sum

$$\rho = \sum_k p_k \rho_1 ^k \otimes \cdots \otimes \rho_n ^k.$$

Or, in the infinite-dimensional case, ρ is separable if it can be approximated in the trace norm by states of the above form.

== Separability criterion ==
The problem of deciding whether a state is separable in general is sometimes called the quantum separability problem in quantum information theory. It is considered to be a difficult problem. It has been shown to be NP-hard in many cases and is believed to be so in general. Some appreciation for this difficulty can be obtained if one attempts to solve the problem by employing the direct brute force approach, for a fixed dimension. The problem quickly becomes intractable, even for low dimensions. Thus more sophisticated formulations are required. The separability problem is a subject of current research.

A separability criterion is a necessary condition a state must satisfy to be separable. In the low-dimensional (2 X 2 and 2 X 3) cases, the Peres–Horodecki criterion is actually a necessary and sufficient condition for separability. Other separability criteria include (but not limited to) the range criterion, reduction criterion, and those based on uncertainty relations. See Ref. for a review of separability criteria in discrete variable systems.

In continuous variable systems, the Peres–Horodecki criterion also applies. Specifically, Simon formulated a particular version of the Peres–Horodecki criterion in terms of the second-order moments of canonical operators and showed that it is necessary and sufficient for $1\oplus1$-mode Gaussian states (see Ref. for a seemingly different but essentially equivalent approach). It was later found that Simon's condition is also necessary and sufficient for $1\oplus n$-mode Gaussian states, but no longer sufficient for $2\oplus2$-mode Gaussian states. Simon's condition can be generalized by taking into account the higher order moments of canonical operators or by using entropic measures.

== Testing for separability ==
Testing for separability in the general case is an NP-hard problem. Leinaas et al. formulated an iterative, probabilistic algorithm for testing if a given state is separable. When the algorithm is successful, it gives an explicit, random, representation of the given state as a separable state. Otherwise it gives the distance of the given state from the nearest separable state it can find.

== Optimization over the set of separable states ==
The set of separable states appear in computing the convex roof of a function defined on pure states $E(|\Psi_k\rangle)$

$$\min_{\{p_k,|\Psi_k\rangle\}} \sum_k p_k E(|\Psi_k\rangle),$$

where the optimization is over all decompositions of the density matrix of the form

$$\varrho=\sum_k p_k |\Psi_k\rangle\langle\Psi_k|.$$

It has been proven that the convex roof of any quantity that can be written as a $Nth$ order polynomial of expectation values for pure states as

$$E(|\Psi\rangle)=\sum_{m=1}^M \sum_{n=1}^N c_{mn} \langle A_m \rangle^n,$$

where $A_m$ are operators and $c_{mn}$ are constants, can be computed with an optimization over symmetric separable states. In particular, the convex roof can be obtained as an optimization over $N$-copy symmetric fully separable states

$$E(\varrho)= \min_{\omega_{12..N}}{\rm Tr}(L\omega_{12..N}),$$

where $\omega_{12..N}$ is symmetric, fully separable, all its marginals are $\varrho$, and $L$ is an appropriately defined operator given as

$$L=\sum_{mn} A_m^{\otimes n}\otimes {\rm Identity}^{\otimes (N-n)}.$$

The next example shows a relevant convex roof in quantum physics. The quantum Fisher information can be given as four times the convex roof of the variance

$$F_Q[\varrho,H]=4 \min_{\{p_k,|\Psi_k\rangle\}} \sum_k p_k (\Delta H)^2_{\Psi_k}.$$

The optimization problem can be written as

$$\begin{align}
F_Q[\varrho,H]=
\min_{ \varrho_{12} }\;&
2{\rm Tr}[(H\otimes{\rm Identity}-{\rm Identity}\otimes H)^2  \varrho_{12} ],\\
\textrm{s.t.}\;&
\varrho_{12}\in {\rm Sep},\\
& {\rm Tr}_2(\varrho_{12})=\varrho,\\
& {\rm Tr}_1(\varrho_{12})=\varrho,
\end{align}$$

where Sep is the set of bipartite separable states.

Another example is the convex roof of the linear entropy of the reduced state in a bipartite system

$$E_{\rm lin}(\varrho)=\min_{\{p_k,|\Psi_k\rangle\}} \sum_k p_k \{1-{\rm Tr}[  {\rm Tr_2}(|\Psi_{k}\rangle\langle\Psi_{k}| ) ^2  ]\},$$

which is zero if and only if the density matrix is separable. A polinomial with $N=2$ is sufficient to compute the quantity above. It is an alternative of the entanglement of formation that is simpler to calculate.

A similar idea has been used to define the quantum Wasserstein distance based on an optimization over separable states. In particular, the distance beween states $\varrho$ and $\sigma$ can be defined as

$$\begin{align}
D_{\rm sep}(\varrho,\sigma)^2=\frac 1 2
\min_{ \varrho_{12}}&\sum_{n=1}^N\;
{\rm Tr}[(H_n\otimes{\rm Identity} -{\rm Identity}\otimes H_n)^2  \varrho_{12} ],\\
\textrm{s.t.}\; &
\varrho_{12}\in\mathrm{Sep}, \\
& {\rm Tr}_1(\varrho_{12})=\varrho, \\
& {\rm Tr}_2(\varrho_{12})=\sigma,
\end{align}$$

where $H_n$ are operators. The optimization is over separable states $\varrho_{12}$ with marginals $\varrho$ and $\sigma$.

== See also ==
- Entanglement witness
