= Partial trace =

Function over linear operators

Left-hand side shows a full density matrix $\rho_{AB}$ of a bipartite qubit system. The partial trace is performed over a subsystem of 2-by-2 dimension (single qubit density matrix). The right hand side shows the resulting 2-by-2 reduced density matrix $\rho_A$.

Visualizing the partial trace in a composite vector space. This diagram illustrates the partial trace operation on an 8×8 matrix representing a linear operator acting on a tripartite composite vector space $V = V_A \otimes V_B \otimes V_C$. In this case, each of the subspaces ($V_A, V_B, V_C$) are of dimension 2, meaning they are represented by 2×2 matrices. The subspaces can describe two-level systems ($\mathbb{C}^2$), for example. Tracing out one subspace results in a 4×4 matrix representation of the resulting operator. Elements in squares connected with lines are added together.

In linear algebra and functional analysis, the partial trace is a generalization of the trace. Whereas the trace is a scalar-valued function on operators, the partial trace is an operator-valued function. The partial trace has applications in quantum information and decoherence which is relevant for quantum measurement and thereby to the decoherent approaches to interpretations of quantum mechanics, including consistent histories and the relative state interpretation.

== Details ==
Suppose $V$, $W$ are finite-dimensional vector spaces over a field, with dimensions $m$ and $n$, respectively. For any space $A$, let $L(A)$ denote the space of linear operators on $A$. The partial trace over $W$ is then written as $\operatorname{Tr}_W: \operatorname{L}(V \otimes W) \to \operatorname{L}(V)$, where $\otimes$ denotes the Tensor Product.

It is defined as follows: For $T\in \operatorname{L}(V \otimes W)$, let $e_1, \ldots, e_m$, and $f_1, \ldots, f_n$, be bases for V and W respectively; then T has a matrix representation

$$\{a_{k \ell, i j}\}  \quad 1 \leq k, i \leq m, \quad 1 \leq \ell,j \leq n$$

relative to the basis $e_k \otimes f_\ell$ of $V \otimes W$.

Now for indices k, i in the range 1, ..., m, consider the sum

$$b_{k, i} = \sum_{j=1}^n a_{k j, i j}$$

This gives a matrix b_{k,i}. The associated linear operator on V is independent of the choice of bases and is by definition the partial trace.

Among physicists, this is often called "tracing out" or "tracing over" W to leave only an operator on V in the context where W and V are Hilbert spaces associated with quantum systems (see below).

=== Invariant definition ===
The partial trace operator can be defined invariantly (that is, without reference to a basis) as follows: it is the unique linear map

$$\operatorname{Tr}_W: \operatorname{L}(V \otimes W) \rightarrow \operatorname{L}(V)$$

such that

$$\operatorname{Tr}_W(R \otimes S) = \operatorname{Tr}(S) \, R \quad \forall R \in \operatorname{L}(V) \quad \forall S \in \operatorname{L}(W).$$

To see that the conditions above determine the partial trace uniquely, let $v_1, \ldots, v_m$ form a basis for $V$, let $w_1, \ldots, w_n$ form a basis for $W$, let $E_{ij} : V \to V$ be the map that sends $v_i$ to $v_j$ (and all other basis elements to zero), and let $F_{kl} \colon W \to W$ be the map that sends $w_k$ to $w_l$. Since the vectors $v_i \otimes w_k$ form a basis for $V \otimes W$, the maps $E_{ij} \otimes F_{kl}$ form a basis for $\operatorname{L}(V \otimes W)$.

From this abstract definition, the following properties follow:

$$\operatorname{Tr}_W (I_{V \otimes W}) = \dim W \ I_{V}$$
$$\operatorname{Tr}_W (T (I_V \otimes S)) = \operatorname{Tr}_W ((I_V \otimes S) T) \quad \forall S \in \operatorname{L}(W) \quad \forall T \in \operatorname{L}(V \otimes W).$$

=== Category theoretic notion ===
It is the partial trace of linear transformations that is the subject of Joyal, Street, and Verity's notion of Traced monoidal category. A traced monoidal category is a monoidal category $(C,\otimes,I)$ together with, for objects X, Y, U in the category, a function of Hom-sets,

$$\operatorname{Tr}^U_{X,Y} : \operatorname{Hom}_C(X\otimes U, Y\otimes U) \to \operatorname{Hom}_C(X,Y)$$

satisfying certain axioms.

Another case of this abstract notion of partial trace takes place in the category of finite sets and bijections between them, in which the monoidal product is disjoint union. One can show that for any finite sets, X,Y,U and bijection $X+U\cong Y+U$ there exists a corresponding "partially traced" bijection $X\cong Y$.

== Partial trace for operators on Hilbert spaces ==
The partial trace generalizes to operators on infinite dimensional Hilbert spaces. Suppose V, W are Hilbert spaces, and let

$$\{f_i\}_{i \in I}$$

be an orthonormal basis for W. Now there is an isometric isomorphism

$$\bigoplus_{\ell \in I} (V \otimes \mathbb{C}   f_\ell) \rightarrow V \otimes W$$

Under this decomposition, any operator $T \in \operatorname{L}(V \otimes W)$ can be regarded as an infinite matrix of operators on V

$$\begin{bmatrix} T_{11} & T_{12} & \ldots & T_{1 j} & \ldots \\
T_{21} & T_{22} & \ldots & T_{2 j} & \ldots \\
\vdots & \vdots & & \vdots \\
T_{k1}& T_{k2} & \ldots & T_{k j} & \ldots \\
\vdots  & \vdots & & \vdots
\end{bmatrix},$$

where $T_{k \ell} \in \operatorname{L}(V)$.

First suppose T is a non-negative operator. In this case, all the diagonal entries of the above matrix are non-negative operators on V. If the sum

$$\sum_{\ell} T_{\ell \ell}$$

converges in the strong operator topology of L(V), it is independent of the chosen basis of W. The partial trace Tr_{W}(T) is defined to be this operator. The partial trace of a self-adjoint operator is defined if and only if the partial traces of the positive and negative parts are defined.

=== Computing the partial trace ===
Suppose W has an orthonormal basis, which we denote by ket vector notation as $\{ \vert \ell \rangle\}_\ell$. Then

$$\operatorname{Tr}_W\left(\sum_{k,\ell} T^{(k \ell)} \, \otimes \, | k \rangle \langle \ell |\right) = \sum_j T^{(j j)} .$$

The superscripts in parentheses do not represent matrix components, but instead label the matrix itself.

== Partial trace and invariant integration ==
In the case of finite dimensional Hilbert spaces, there is a useful way of looking at partial trace involving integration with respect to a suitably normalized Haar measure μ over the unitary group U(W) of W. Suitably normalized means that μ is taken to be a measure with total mass dim(W).

Theorem. Suppose V, W are finite dimensional Hilbert spaces. Then

$$\int_{\operatorname{U}(W)} (I_V \otimes U^*) T (I_V \otimes U) \ d \mu(U)$$

commutes with all operators of the form $I_V \otimes S$ and hence is uniquely of the form $R \otimes I_W$. The operator R is the partial trace of T.

== Partial trace as a quantum operation ==
The partial trace can be viewed as a quantum operation. Consider a quantum mechanical system whose state space is the tensor product $H_A \otimes H_B$ of Hilbert spaces. A mixed state is described by a density matrix ρ, that is, a non-negative trace-class operator of trace 1 on the tensor product $H_A \otimes H_B .$ The partial trace of ρ with respect to the system B, denoted by $\rho ^A$, is called the reduced state of ρ on system A. In symbols,
$$\rho^A = \operatorname{Tr}_B \rho.$$

To show that this is indeed a sensible way to assign a state on the A subsystem to ρ, we offer the following justification. Let M be an observable on the subsystem A, then the corresponding observable on the composite system is $M \otimes I$. However one chooses to define a reduced state $\rho^A$, there should be consistency of measurement statistics. The expectation value of M after the subsystem A is prepared in $\rho ^A$ and that of $M \otimes I$ when the composite system is prepared in ρ should be the same, i.e. the following equality should hold:

$$\operatorname{Tr}_A ( M \cdot \rho^A) = \operatorname{Tr} ( M \otimes I \cdot \rho).$$

We see that this is satisfied if $\rho ^A$ is as defined above via the partial trace. Furthermore, such operation is unique.

Let T(H) be the Banach space of trace-class operators on the Hilbert space H. It can be easily checked that the partial trace, viewed as a map

$$\operatorname{Tr}_B : T(H_A \otimes H_B) \rightarrow T(H_A)$$

is completely positive and trace-preserving.

The density matrix ρ is Hermitian, positive semi-definite, and has a trace of 1. It has a spectral decomposition:

$$\rho=\sum_{m}p_m|\Psi_m\rangle\langle \Psi_m|;\ 0\leq p_m\leq 1,\ \sum_{m}p_m=1$$

Its easy to see that the partial trace $\rho ^A$ also satisfies these conditions. For example, for any pure state $|\psi_A\rangle$ in $H_A$, we have

$$\langle\psi_A|\rho^A|\psi_A\rangle=\sum_{m}p_m\operatorname{Tr}_B[\langle\psi_A|\Psi_m\rangle\langle \Psi_m|\psi_A\rangle]\geq 0$$

Note that the term $\operatorname{Tr}_B[\langle\psi_A|\Psi_m\rangle\langle \Psi_m|\psi_A\rangle]$ represents the probability of finding the state $|\psi_A\rangle$ when the composite system is in the state $|\Psi_m\rangle$. This proves the positive semi-definiteness of $\rho ^A$.

The partial trace map as given above induces a dual map $\operatorname{Tr}_B ^*$ between the C*-algebras of bounded operators on $\; H_A$ and $H_A \otimes H_B$ given by

$$\operatorname{Tr}_B ^* (A) = A \otimes I.$$

$\operatorname{Tr}_B ^*$ maps observables to observables and is the Heisenberg picture representation of $\operatorname{Tr}_B$.

=== Comparison with classical case ===
Suppose instead of quantum mechanical systems, the two systems A and B are classical. The space of observables for each system are then abelian C*-algebras. These are of the form C(X) and C(Y) respectively for compact spaces X, Y. The state space of the composite system is simply

$$C(X) \otimes C(Y) = C(X \times Y).$$

A state on the composite system is a positive element ρ of the dual of C(X × Y), which by the Riesz–Markov theorem corresponds to a regular Borel measure on X × Y. The corresponding reduced state is obtained by projecting the measure ρ to X. Thus the partial trace is the quantum mechanical equivalent of this operation.
