= August 1960 =

Month of 1960

<<	August 1960					>>
Su	Mo	Tu	We	Th	Fr	Sa
	1	2	3	4	5	6
7	8	9	10	11	12	13
14	15	16	17	18	19	20
21	22	23	24	25	26	27
28	29	30	31

August 1: Dahomey (now Benin) independent

August 3: Niger independent

August 15: Former French Congo independent

August 5: Upper Volta (now Burkina Faso) independent

August 16: Cyprus independent from the UK

August 7: Ivory Coast (now Cote d'Ivoire) independent

August 17: Gabon independent

August 11: Chad independent

August 20: Senegal independent

August 13: Central African Republic independent

August 20: Mali independent

The following events occurred in August 1960:

== August 1, 1960 (Monday) ==
- At a dinner at the Swiss Embassy in Beijing, Communist Chinese Premier Zhou Enlai proposed negotiating a peace treaty with the United States, to create "a non-nuclear zone in Asia and the Western Pacific" region. A press officer for the U.S. State Department rejected the idea as "another meaningless propaganda gesture".
- The Republic of Dahomey, formerly part of French West Africa as French Dahomey, became independent, with Hubert Maga as its first president. In 1975, it would change its name to the Republic of Benin.
- Typhoon Shirley struck Taiwan, killing 126 people.
- Born:
  - Chuck D (stage name for Carlton Douglas Ridenhour), American rapper, leader and frontman of the hip hop group Public Enemy; in Long Island, New York
  - Professor Griff (stage name for Richard Griffin), American rapper, spoken word artist, lecturer and former member of Public Enemy; in Roosevelt, New York
  - Micheál Martin, Irish politician, Taoiseach (2020-2022; 2025-present), in Cork

== August 2, 1960 (Tuesday) ==
- The Continental League, proposed as a third major league for baseball, came to an end after CL President Branch Rickey and co-founder William Shea concluded a meeting in Chicago with representatives of the National League and American League. The NL and AL, each with eight teams, had been confronted with the proposed eight team CL. By agreement, each established league would place franchises in proposed CL cities. For 1962, three Continental sites had franchises, with the National League adding the New York Mets and the Houston Colt .45s (later the Astros), while the American League allowed its Washington Senators to relocate to the Minneapolis-St. Paul area as the Minnesota Twins. In later years, teams would be placed in Atlanta (1966), Dallas (1972), Toronto (1976) and Denver (1993). Buffalo, New York, was the only Continental site that would still be without a major league team nearly 60 years later.

== August 3, 1960 (Wednesday) ==
- Hector Trujillo resigned abruptly as president of the Dominican Republic. The brother of de facto leader Rafael Trujillo had served as a figurehead and was succeeded by Joaquín Balaguer.
- A fire at the Soviet research center at Mirny Station in Antarctica, fed by gale-force winds and hampered by a lack of equipment, killed eight meteorologists.
- The Republic of Niger, formerly part of French West Africa as the Colony of Niger, became independent, with Hamani Diori as its first president.
- Redstone launch vehicle No. 1 was delivered to Cape Canaveral for the uncrewed Mercury 1 mission to be launched in November.

== August 4, 1960 (Thursday) ==
- NASA test pilot Joseph A. Walker became the fastest man in history as he flew a North American X-15 at a speed of 2,196 miles per hour (3,534 km/h), breaking a record set in 1956 by Milburn Apt, who had been killed while flying a Bell X-2.
- Born: José Luis Rodríguez Zapatero, Prime Minister of Spain from 2004 to 2011; in Valladolid

== August 5, 1960 (Friday) ==
- The Republic of Upper Volta, formerly part of French West Africa as French Upper Volta, became independent, with Maurice Yaméogo as its first president. In 1984, the nation changed its name to Burkina Faso.
- Died: Arthur Meighen, 86, Prime Minister of Canada from 1920 to 1921, and briefly in 1926

== August 6, 1960 (Saturday) ==
- In response to a United States embargo against Cuba, Fidel Castro nationalized American and foreign-owned property in the nation.

== August 7, 1960 (Sunday) ==
- Côte d'Ivoire (also referred to as the Ivory Coast), formerly part of French West Africa, became independent of France, with Félix Houphouët-Boigny as its first president.
- The Bluebell Railway, in Sussex, England, began regular operation as the first standard gauge steam-operated passenger preserved railway in the world.
- Born: David Duchovny, American actor, producer, novelist, and singer-songwriter; in New York City

== August 8, 1960 (Monday) ==
South Kasai flag

- The Mining State of South Kasai, with its capital at Bakwanga (now Mbuji-Mayi), seceded from the rest of the Republic of the Congo, by declaration of Chief Albert Kalonji. Congolese troops recaptured Bakwanga two weeks later on August 24.

== August 9, 1960 (Tuesday) ==
- The government of Laos was overthrown in a coup led by Captain Kong Le, and supported by rebellious units within the Laotian Army. Prime Minister Samsonith was in Luang Prabang, making preparations for the funeral of the late King of Laos, when the army units struck in Vientiane. Former Premier Souvanna Phouma formed a new cabinet on August 15, and civil war was averted after the new King asked, on August 29, that a new ministry be created, and to include members of the old regime. The legislature approved the new ministry on August 31.
- Voters in a referendum in Alaska elected (by a margin of about 19,000 to 17,000) against moving the state capital from Juneau to a new site to be constructed between the Cook Inlet and Fairbanks.

== August 10, 1960 (Wednesday) ==
- U.S. Navy frogmen successfully recovered the satellite Discoverer 13, marking the first retrieval of a satellite after twelve previous attempts had failed. Although plans to make the first mid-air capture failed, the recovery opened the era of the spy satellite.
- The Wright Air Development Center requested that NASA Headquarters provide the center with pertinent working papers and reports on Project Mercury, especially on human factor aspects, for possible application in the X-20 Dyna Soar program.
- The Institute of Heraldry was created under United States Army General Order Number 29.
- The Canadian Bill of Rights became effective.
- Born: Antonio Banderas, Spanish actor and director; in Málaga

== August 11, 1960 (Thursday) ==
- The Republic of Chad, formerly part of French Equatorial Africa as French Chad, became independent, with François Tombalbaye as its first president.
- Representatives of NASA, McDonnell Aircraft Corporation, Air Force Ballistic Missile Division, Space Technology Laboratories, and Convair met at Cape Canaveralto discuss the recent Mercury-Atlas 1 (MA-1) mission malfunction. James A. Chamberlin of the Space Task Group was appointed chairman of a joint committee to resolve the problems and to provide a solution prior to the Mercury-Atlas 2 (MA-2) mission.
- The Mercury spacecraft landing system qualification test program was completed.

== August 12, 1960 (Friday) ==
- NASA successfully launched Echo 1, the first communications satellite. Weighing 137 pounds (62 kg), Echo was a 100-foot-diameter (30 m) Mylar balloon, inflated after it reached orbit when the Sun's heat converted powders inside the balloon into gas. A pre-recorded message from U.S. President Eisenhower was transmitted from Goldstone, California, bounced off of Echo, and received at a station in Holmdel, New Jersey. The largest satellite launched up to that time, Echo was big enough that it could be seen from the Earth as it orbited at an average altitude of 1,000 miles (1,600 km).
- USAF Major Robert M. White set a record by flying an X-15 rocket plane to an altitude of 136,500 feet (26.85 miles or 41.6 kilometers), besting the mark of 126,200 feet (38,500 m) set by Iven C. Kincheloe in an X-2 in 1956.
- Dr. Seuss published the popular children's book, Green Eggs and Ham, which has sold more than 8 million copies worldwide as of 2019.

== August 13, 1960 (Saturday) ==
- The Central African Republic, formerly Ubangi-Shari in the colony of French Equatorial Africa, became independent, with David Dacko as its president.
- Typhoon Wendy killed at least 18 people in central Japan.

== August 14, 1960 (Sunday) ==
- North Korea's chairman Kim Il Sung made his first proposal for the reunification of his nation and South Korea under a "North–South Confederation" or "Confederal Republic of Koryo". The plan, proposed again in 1971, 1980 and 1991, envisioned both nations initially keeping their political systems, with a "Supreme National Committee" to guide cultural and economic development.

== August 15, 1960 (Monday) ==
- The Republic of the Congo, an autonomous colony of France since 1958, formerly known as the French Congo or a part of French Equatorial Africa, attained independence under that name, becoming the second nation to use that name. In that the Belgian Congo was also referred to as the Republic of the Congo, reference to the nation's capital was made as Congo (Brazzaville), to distinguish it from Congo (Léopoldville) (later Zaire), and now the Democratic Republic of the Congo. Former Roman Catholic priest Fulbert Youlou became the nation's first president.

== August 16, 1960 (Tuesday) ==
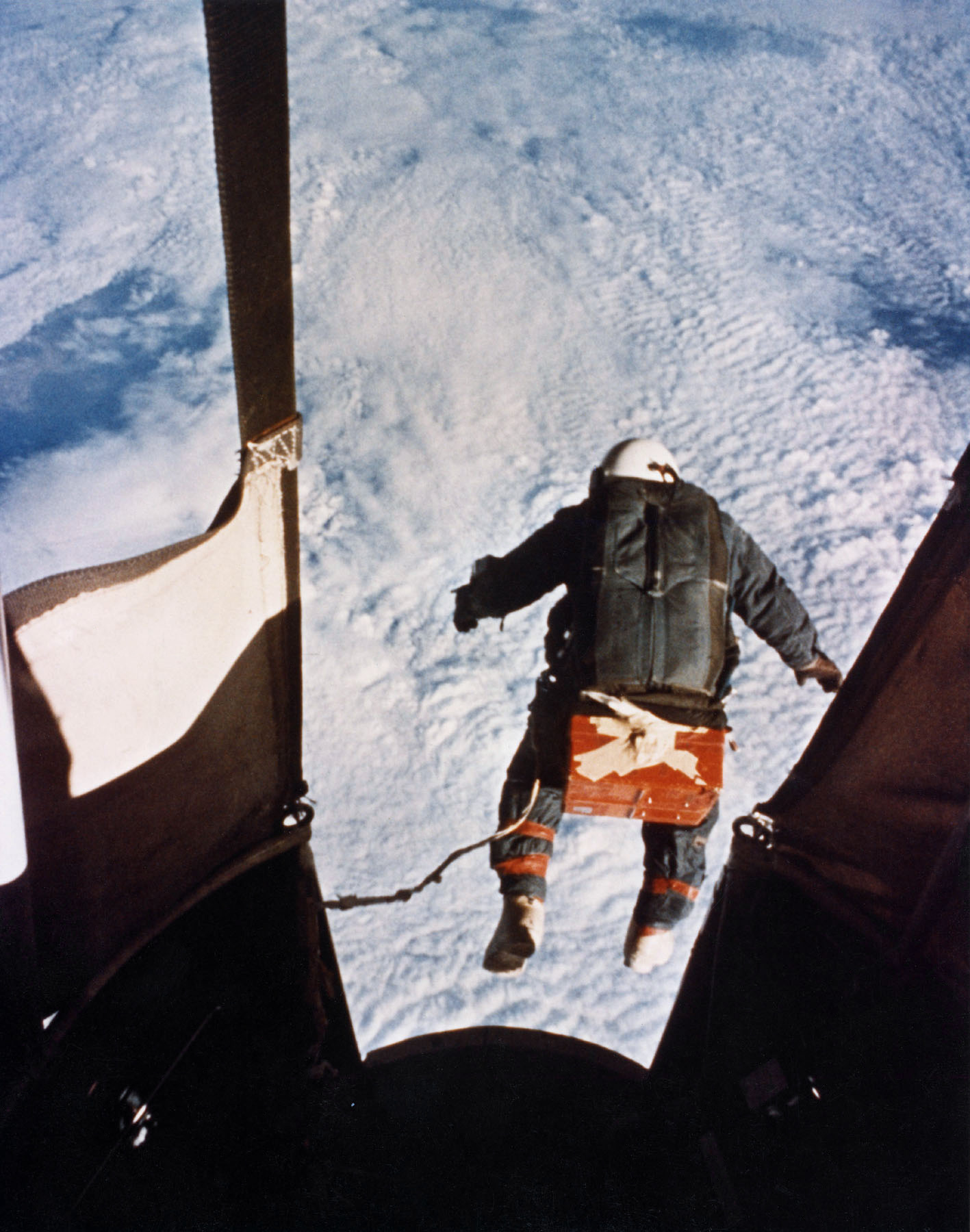
August 16, 1960: Kittinger jumps

- Joseph Kittinger parachuted from a balloon over New Mexico at 102,800 feet (31,333 m). He set records, which stood for 52 years, for highest altitude jump; longest free-fall by falling 16 miles (25.7 km) over a period of 4 minutes and 38 seconds before opening his parachute; and fastest speed by a human without motorized assistance (614 mph). On October 14, 2012, Felix Baumgartner of Austria (using Kittinger as his adviser) would break all of Kittinger's records except for the longest duration for a free-fall, plunging 128,100 ft (39,045 m) in 4 minutes, 19 seconds.
- After 82 years as a British colony, the Mediterranean island of Cyprus was proclaimed independent by its last British Governor, Sir Hugh Foot. The new state, populated by Cypriots of Greek and Turkish descent, had Greek Cypriot Archbishop Makarios III as its president, and Turkish Cypriot Fazıl Küçük as its vice-president. The Sovereign Base Areas of Akrotiri and Dhekelia would remain as British Overseas Territories.
- A three-day design engineering inspection of Mercury spacecraft No. 7 began, as the astronauts requesting changes in the control panel for easier pilot operation.

== August 17, 1960 (Wednesday) ==
- While campaigning for the presidency in Greensboro, North Carolina, Richard Nixon bumped his left knee on a car door. What seemed, at first, to be a minor injury, led to a painful infection and Nixon's hospitalization on August 29. Nixon was kept at Walter Reed Hospital for 11 days, until asking to be discharged early on September 9 after a poll showed that John F. Kennedy had taken a lead over him in voter preferences. His injury, his nearly two-week absence from the campaign trail, and his continued illness would be cited by historians as a factor in his defeat, from the loss of momentum after his nomination to his poor appearance in the first televised presidential debate.
- The first successful running of a computer program written in COBOL was carried out on an RCA 501 computer. COBOL, the "Common Business Oriented Language", was an improvement in the adaptation of the FLOW-MATIC computer language developed by Grace Hopper.
- All 27 people aboard Aeroflot Flight 36 were killed when the Il-18 airliner caught fire while approaching Moscow after departing Cairo. The airplane crashed near Kiev.
- Gabon, formerly part of French Equatorial Africa, was granted independence from France.
- In Argentina, after the capture of Adolf Eichmann by Israel, members of the neo-Nazi Tacuara group shot at Jewish students, injuring 15-year-old Edgardo Trilnik.
- Born: Sean Penn, American actor, screenwriter, and politician; in Santa Monica, California

== August 18, 1960 (Thursday) ==
- The first photograph ever from a spy satellite was taken, after the launch of the American Discoverer 14 at 12:15 p.m. PDT, and showed a Soviet airfield at Mys Shmidta. With 3,000 feet (910 m) of film, the satellite took more pictures than all 24 of the U-2 spy plane flights put together, and revealed the existence, not previously known to the U.S., of 64 airfields and 26 missile bases.
- At a meeting of the U.S. National Security Council, President Eisenhower told CIA Director Allen Dulles that Congolese Premier Patrice Lumumba needed to be "eliminated" in order to keep the Congo from becoming "another Cuba". Robert Johnson, who took notes of the meeting, revealed the information at a Senate hearing years later.
- A French Navy bomber exploded over Morocco, killing all 27 people on board.
- Died:
  - Clarence Hudson, 66, American department store janitor, was electrocuted by a homemade electric chair in his Wenatchee, Washington, apartment. Police estimated that 1,000 volts shot through Hudson's body, as well as several wet towels on his head and feet. Police also investigated a homemade transformer that was used to increase the voltage from a wall outlet which extended a wire from a 25-cent piece.
  - Peter Poole, 28, an English-born engineer, became the first white man to be hanged in Kenya. Poole had been convicted of the murder of a black house servant, Kamawe Musunge.
  - Carlo Emilio Bonferroni, 68, Italian mathematician

== August 19, 1960 (Friday) ==
- The Soviet Union launched Sputnik 5 into orbit, with the dogs Belka and Strelka (Russian for "Squirrel" and "Little Arrow"), 40 mice, 2 rats and a variety of plants. Recovered the next day after 18 orbits, the menagerie became the first living animals to return safely to Earth after being placed into orbit.
- A capsule from the Discoverer 14 satellite became the first object to be recovered in mid-air while returning from space. A C-119 Flying Boxcar, one of ten in the recovery area, snagged the object with "trapeze-like hooks" at an altitude of 8,500 feet (2,600 m).
- In Moscow, downed American U-2 pilot Francis Gary Powers was convicted of espionage against the Soviet Union, and sentenced to ten years imprisonment. Powers would be released two years later in exchange for the spy Rudolf Abel.
- A French Navy bomber exploded over Morocco, killing all 27 people on board.

== August 20, 1960 (Saturday) ==
- Senegal seceded from the Mali Federation, following a dispute, between Defense Minister Mamadou Dia and Federation Premier Modibo Keita, over whether the Federation's first president would be a figurehead or a strongman. Keita fired Dia, and Dia had Keita arrested. Keita and non-Senegalese members of his cabinet were sent back to Mali the next day, and Dia became the first Prime Minister of Senegal. The Federation had been created by a union of the colonies of Senegal and the French Sudan prior to independence, and the former French Sudan retained the name Republic of Mali.
- Regular television broadcasting began in Norway as the NRK network (Norsk rikskringkasting AS, or Norwegian Broadcasting Corporation) launched what is now its channel NRK1.

== August 21, 1960 (Sunday) ==
- The submarine USS Seadragon completed the first undersea crossing of the Northwest Passage, and then turned toward the North Pole.
- Died: David B. Steinman, 74, American bridge engineer

== August 22, 1960 (Monday) ==
- Leaders of the Tunisian-based Algerian Provisional Government asked the United Nations to hold a referendum in French Algeria on the question of independence from France.
- Discussions in Geneva, between the United States, the Soviet Union and the United Kingdom on a nuclear test-ban treaty, were adjourned indefinitely.

== August 23, 1960 (Tuesday) ==
- Hans Peter Luhn received U.S. Patent No 2,950,048 for "computer for verifying numbers", the Luhn algorithm. Assigned to the IBM Corporation, the checksum formula provides a method for validating credit card numbers.
- Died: Oscar Hammerstein II, 65, American lyricist who is best known for his collaborations with composer Richard Rodgers. A week later, the lights of Times Square were turned off for one minute, and London's West End lights were dimmed in recognition of his contribution to the musical.

== August 24, 1960 (Wednesday) ==
- In Washington, reporters asked President Eisenhower about vice-president (and Republican presidential candidate) Richard Nixon's experience. Charles Mohr of Time magazine asked Ike "if you could give us an example of a major idea of his that you had adopted..." and the President replied "If you give me a week, I might think of one."
- Approval of the Sabin polio vaccine, designed by Dr. Albert Sabin to be taken orally rather than the polio shots developed by Dr. Jonas Salk, was as "suitable for use in the United States" by Surgeon General Leroy Edgar Burney.
- The "coldest temperature recorded on Earth" was measured at −88.3 °C (−126.9 °F) at the Soviet Vostok Station. The current record low is −89.2 °C (−128.6 °F), recorded at the same station on July 21, 1983.
- McDonnell Aircraft Corporation proposed a one-man space station comprising a Mercury capsule plus a cylindrical space laboratory capable of supporting one astronaut in a shirtsleeve environment for 14 days in orbit.
- Sixty people were killed in Brazil when a bus fell from a bridge into a river near São José do Rio Preto.
- Born:
  - Cal Ripken Jr., American baseball player; in Havre de Grace, Maryland
  - Steven W. Lindsey, American astronaut on five Space Shuttle missions; in Arcadia, California
  - Takashi Miike, Japanese filmmaker; in Yao, Osaka

== August 25, 1960 (Thursday) ==
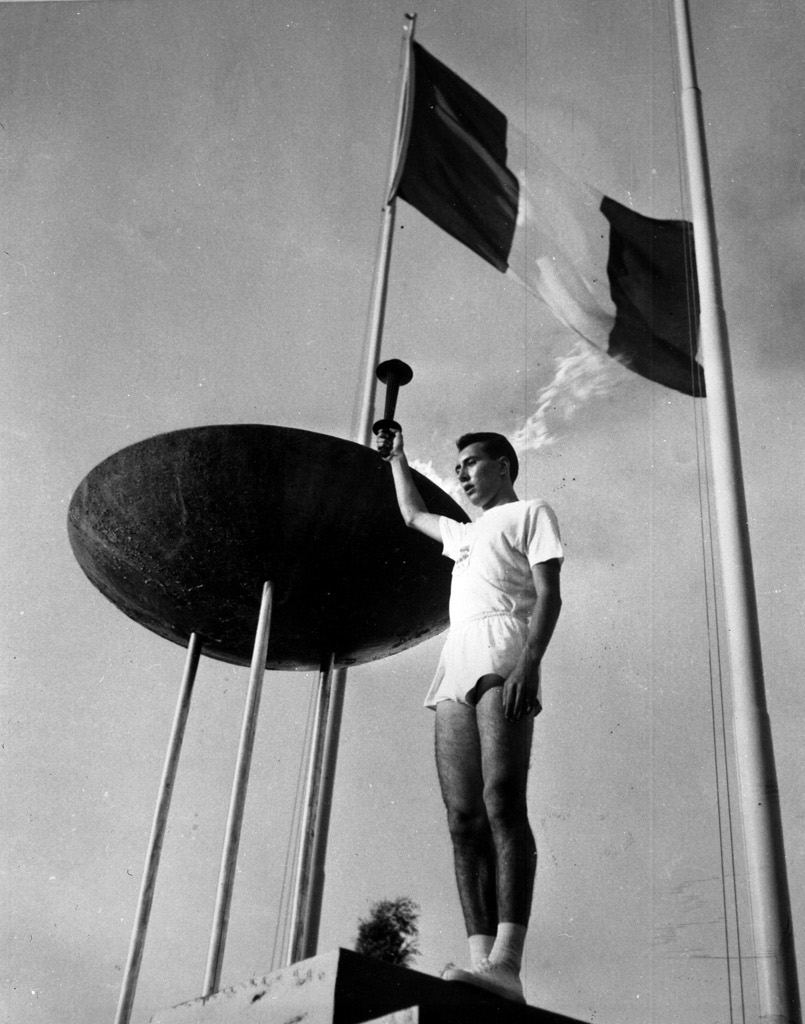
August 25, 1960: Peris lights the Olympic cauldron

- The 1960 Summer Olympics opened in Rome, with a record 5,348 athletes from 83 nations competing. Cross-country champion Giancarlo Peris lit the Olympic flame after Italy's President Giovanni Gronchi declared the Games of the 17th Olympiad open. Competition would continue until September 11.
- The submarine USS Seadragon surfaced at the North Pole, where the crew played softball in the northernmost athletic competition ever staged.
- Born: Jonas Gahr Støre, Norwegian politician, Prime Minister of Norway (2021-present), in Oslo

== August 26, 1960 (Friday) ==
- CIA Director Allen Dulles cabled instructions to station chief Larry Devlin, authorizing wider authority for the "removal" of Congolese Premier Patrice Lumumba, including assassination.
- John Devitt of Australia was declared the winner over Lance Larson of the United States in a controversial judgment at the Summer Olympic swimming competition in the men's 100 meter freestyle.
- Born: Branford Marsalis, American jazz musician; in Breaux Bridge, Louisiana
- Died: Knud Enemark Jensen, 23, Danish cyclist, died in a hospital in Rome after fracturing his skull in a fall during his Olympic cycling event.

== August 27, 1960 (Saturday) ==
- The weekly syndicated country music radio series Louisiana Hayride, which had been broadcast from the Memorial Auditorium in Shreveport, Louisiana since 1948, was retired. Featured on the final broadcast on flagship station KWKH were Grandpa Jones and singer "Country" Johnny Mathis.
- In what became known in the press as "Ax Handle Saturday", racial tensions came to a head in Jacksonville, Florida, as 200 white men armed with baseball bats and axe handles attacked protesters conducting sit-ins at Hemming Plaza.
- In the final of the Women's 200 metre breaststroke at the Olympics, British swimmer Anita Lonsbrough broke the world record with a time of 2:49.5, a 1/2 second ahead of West Germany's Wiltrud Urselmann.

== August 28, 1960 (Sunday) ==
- The Declaration of San José, resulting from a meeting of Ministers of Foreign Affairs at San José, Costa Rica, condemned any interference by extra-continental powers in the affairs of the American republics. The declaration was approved unanimously (19–0).
- The United Nations announced that it had sufficient peacekeeping troops in the Congo to preserve order, and demanded that the last of Belgium's forces there be withdrawn.

== August 29, 1960 (Monday) ==
- Hazza Majali, the Prime Minister of Jordan, was assassinated in the explosion of a time bomb that had been placed in one of the drawers of his desk, at his office in Amman. Eleven other people were killed as well, and 65 were injured.
- A 300 ft (91 m) diameter weather balloon, described by the U.S. Air Force as "the largest ever launched", crashed into a home in Stockton, California, an hour after being sent up from Vernalis Air Force Base. Mrs. Ben Petero evacuated her six children from the frame house after realizing that the balloon was descending on the family home.
- Australian swimmer Dawn Fraser won the Women's 100 metres freestyle for the second time. The next day, Fraser clashed with her teammates, who shunned her for the remainder of the Games in the tradition of "sending one to Coventry".
- Air France Flight 343, a Lockheed L-1049 Super Constellation airliner on a flight from Paris, crashed into the Atlantic Ocean while attempting to land during a torrential rain at Dakar in Senegal, killing all 63 people on board.

== August 30, 1960 (Tuesday) ==
- John F. Kennedy appointed four "Cold War" aides in anticipation of his victory in the United States presidential election.
- Born: Chalino Sánchez, Mexican singer and songwriter; in Municipio de Culiacán, Sinaloa (died of gunshot wounds, 1992)

== August 31, 1960 (Wednesday) ==
- South Africa lifted the state of emergency that had been in effect since the Sharpesville massacre in March.
- Born: Hassan Nasrallah, General Secretary of Hezbollah; in Bourj Hammoud, Lebanon
