= June 1960 =

Month of 1960

| << | June 1960 | | | | | >> |
| Su | Mo | Tu | We | Th | Fr | Sa |
| | | | 1 | 2 | 3 | 4 |
| 5 | 6 | 7 | 8 | 9 | 10 | 11 |
| 12 | 13 | 14 | 15 | 16 | 17 | 18 |
| 19 | 20 | 21 | 22 | 23 | 24 | 25 |
| 26 | 27 | 28 | 29 | 30 |

June 20, 1960: Mali Federation becomes independent

June 26, 1960: Malagasy Republic becomes independent

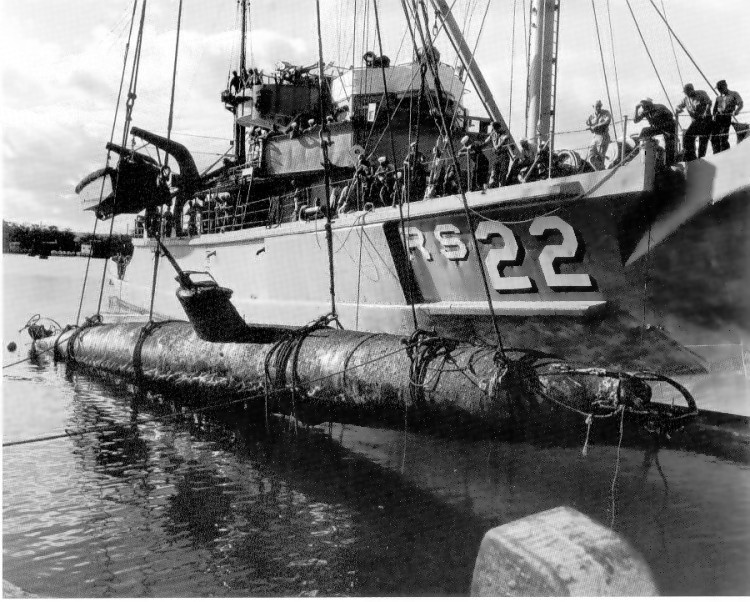
June 13, 1960: Japanese 2-man sub I-18 raised from Pearl Harbor after 18 years

June 26, 1960: Somaliland becomes independent

June 30, 1960: Congo (Leopoldville) becomes independent

The following events occurred in June 1960:

== June 1, 1960 (Wednesday) ==
- The U.S. state of Texas began the "Little School" program, pioneered by Felix Tijerina, in 614 schools statewide. The program, designed to teach Spanish-speaking preschoolers 400 essential English words for a head start in the first grade, enrolled 15,805 children at its start.
- Television was introduced to New Zealand, as broadcasts started in Auckland on AKTV, Channel 2, at 7:30 p.m. and continued until 10:00 p.m. The first program was an episode of The Adventures of Robin Hood.
- In Laredo, Texas, Charles Manson was arrested on charges of violating the Mann Act and his parole terms. He would remain in prison until 1967 and go on to infamy as leader of a cult of serial killers.
- In a record that still stands, a 114-pound (52 kg) roosterfish was caught by fisherman Abe Sackheim at La Paz, Baja California Sur.
- Trans-Canada Air Lines began transatlantic jet service, with a Douglas DC-8 aircraft flying a route from Montreal to London.
- In St. Louis, Chuck Berry was acquitted by a jury of charges of violating the Mann Act.
- Died: Lester Patrick, 78, who, as first coach of the NHL's New York Rangers, popularized ice hockey in the United States.

== June 2, 1960 (Thursday) ==
- For the first time since 1919, New York's 22 Broadway theaters were closed, and scheduled performances were cancelled. The "theater blackout" was occasioned by a dispute between the Actors Equity Association and the League of New York Theaters but was resolved after eleven days.
- At a concert at the civic hall in Neston, Cheshire, John Lennon, Paul McCartney, George Harrison, Stu Sutcliffe and Tommy Moore performed for the first time under the name The Beatles.
- In considering possible meteoroid damage to the Mercury spacecraft in orbit, the Space Task Group concluded that damage likelihood was small even during periods of meteor showers. However, it was recommended that Mercury missions not be scheduled during forecasted shower periods.
- Born:
  - Tony Hadley, English singer (Spandau Ballet); in Islington, London
  - Kyle Petty, NASCAR driver; in Randleman, North Carolina

== June 3, 1960 (Friday) ==
June 3, 1960: Sega Corporation established

- The Japanese electronics company Sega was established as Nihon Goraku Bussan by American businessmen Martin Bromley and Richard Stewart. Originally a maker coin-operated machines, the company would become famous for releasing the first Sonic the Hedgehog game in 1991. Sonic would later become a multi-billion dollar franchise for the Sega company.
- Argentina demanded that Israel return Adolf Eichmann, and then asked for reparations for Eichmann's seizure by Mossad agents in Buenos Aires. On August 2, the dispute was resolved by Israel keeping Eichmann, but acknowledging that Argentina's fundamental rights had been infringed upon.
- Canadian Prime Minister John Diefenbaker arrived in Washington, D.C., for a state visit and private talks with U.S. President Dwight D. Eisenhower.
- The Aerospace Corporation, a non-profit company, was incorporated in California.
- Born: Don Brown, American novelist and attorney; in Plymouth, North Carolina
- Died: Ana Pauker, 67, former Romanian Minister of Foreign Affairs (1947 to 1952) and the first woman to serve as a foreign minister of any nation

== June 4, 1960 (Saturday) ==
- Articles 85 and 86 of the Constitution of France were amended to permit former territories to attain complete independence and to remain as members of the French Community. The decision did not save the Community, which had only six members—Gabon, Congo, Chad, the CAR, the Malagasy Republic and France—left by 1962.
- Born: Bradley Walsh, English comedian and actor; in Watford, Hertfordshire
- Died: Józef Haller, 87, Polish military leader

== June 5, 1960 (Sunday) ==
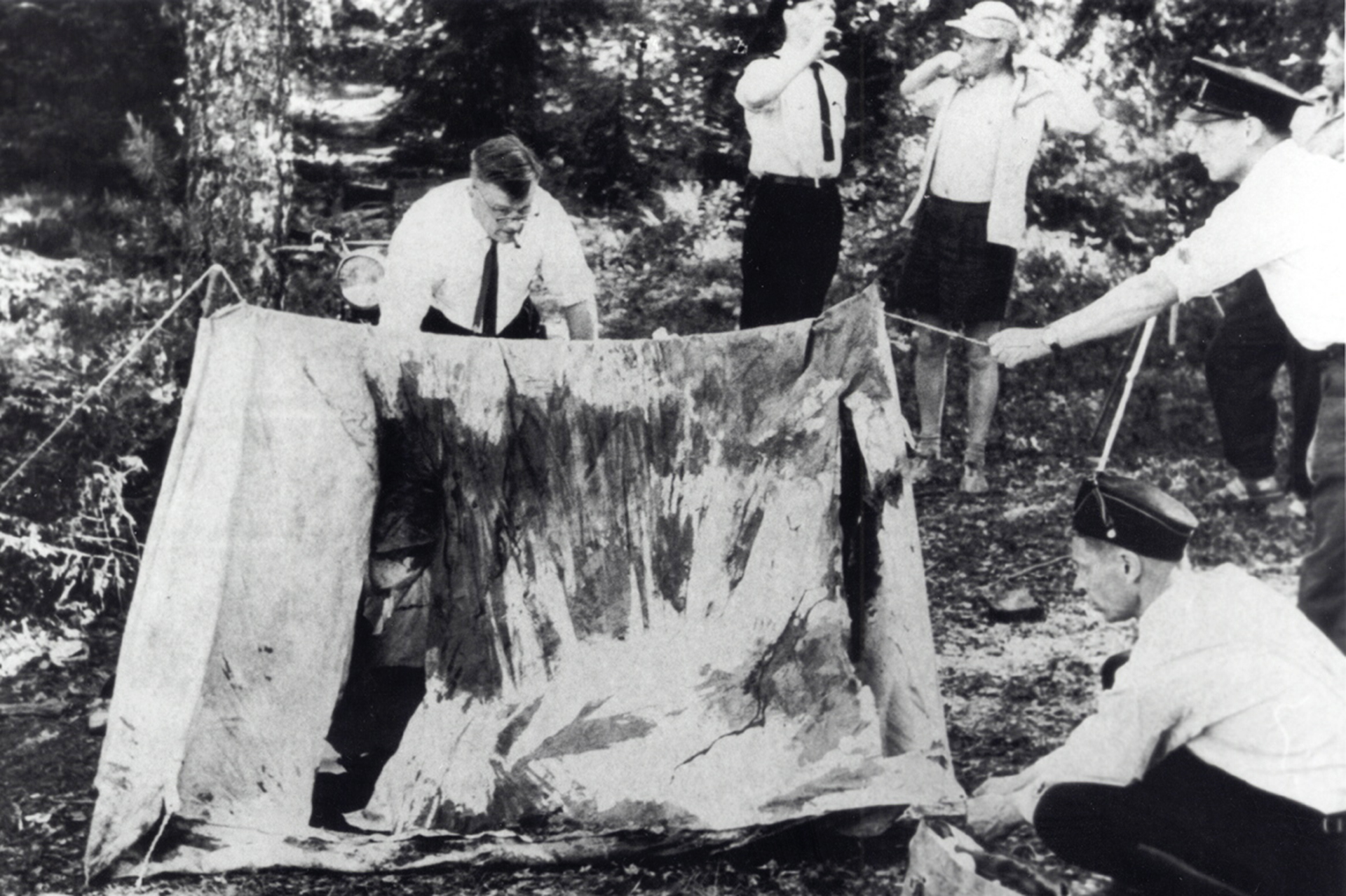
June 5, 1960: Police investigating the tent on the scene of the Bodom murders

- The infamous unsolved case of the Lake Bodom murders took place at Bodom Lake in Espoo, Uusimaa, when Maila Björklund, Anja Mäki, and Seppo Boisman were stabbed to death while asleep inside their tent. Nils Gustafsson, the fourth member of the group, who had been seriously wounded, would be arrested nearly 44 years later, but would be acquitted.
- Dwight D. Eisenhower became the first incumbent President of the United States to deliver the commencement speech at the University of Notre Dame. Jimmy Carter (1977), Ronald Reagan (1981), George H. W. Bush (1992), George W. Bush (2001) and Barack Obama (2009) would later speak at the Notre Dame commencement.
- Voters in a referendum in Cambodia approved making Prince Norodom Sihanouk as a non-royal Chief of State. The "official" result of the non-secret vote was 99.98% in favor of Sihanouk.
- Died: Rudell Stitch, 27, American professional welterweight boxer, drowned while trying to rescue a friend who had fallen overboard in the Ohio River. Stitch had planned to sign a contract the next day for a July 24 rematch against world welterweight champion Luis Manuel Rodriguez.

== June 6, 1960 (Monday) ==
- The first fixed-rate heart pacemaker, with five year mercuric-oxide battery and designed by a team headed by William Chardack, was implanted in a patient.
- The American Heart Association announced a "statistical association" between heavy cigarette smoking and coronary heart disease, with heavy smokers having 50 to 150 percent greater death rate from heart disease than non-smokers.
- The 1954 Convention Relating to the Status of Stateless Persons went into effect, protecting the rights of any "person who is not considered as a national by any State under the operation of its law".
- Lightweight boxer Tommy Pacheco was fatally injured in a bout with Benny Gordon at St. Nicholas Arena in New York. Pacheco died three days later from a cerebral hemorrhage.
- Barbra Streisand, an 18-year-old Brooklynite, began a professional singing career by winning $50 in a talent contest at "The Lion", a nightclub in Greenwich Village.
- At the Dutch Grand Prix in Zandvoort, won by Jack Brabham, a spectator was killed. Dan Gurney's car skidded off the track, fatally injuring 18-year old Piet Aalders of Haarlem.
- Born: Steve Vai, American guitarist; in Long Island, New York
- Died: Ernest L. Blumenschein, 86, American painter

== June 7, 1960 (Tuesday) ==
- A BOMARC missile, and its nuclear warhead, caught fire at McGuire Air Force Base in New Jersey. Although a liquid helium tank in the missile exploded, and the warhead was melted by the fire, there was no risk of a nuclear blast in the Philadelphia area. The accident did cause a spillage of plutonium, and the contaminated areas were subsequently encased under asphalt and concrete.
- Ronald Reagan resigned as President of the Screen Actors Guild.

== June 8, 1960 (Wednesday) ==
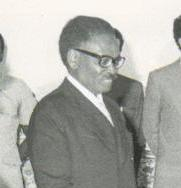
Dr. Neto

- Dr. Agostinho Neto, leader of the MPLA in Portuguese West Africa (now Angola), was arrested by colonial authorities at his clinic at Catete, and charged with subversion by colonial authorities. Dr. Neto would later be released, and, in 1975, would become the first President of Angola.
- In elections in the Canadian province of Saskatchewan, Premier Tommy Douglas's Co-operative Commonwealth Federation won a fifth consecutive majority. The election was significant as the first in which the province's Indians had voted.
- Born: Mick Hucknall, English rock singer and songwriter (Simply Red); in Denton

== June 9, 1960 (Thursday) ==
- Typhoon Mary made landfall near Hong Kong and then moved across to the Fukien Province of China, killing more than 1,600 people.
- The new American Football League signed a five-year television contract with the ABC television network for $8.5 million.
- The United States Weather Bureau estimated that it would require $50,000 during fiscal year 1961 in support of Project Mercury. Bureau responsibilities included weather forecasting for Mercury launching and recovery activities, climatological studies along the area of the Mercury ground track, and environmental studies of specified areas.
- Died: Tsutomu Sato, pioneering Japanese ophthalmologist who developed refractive surgery for vision improvement

== June 10, 1960 (Friday) ==
- All 31 people aboard Aeroflot Flight 207 were killed in the Soviet Union on an Ilyushin 14P that had departed Rostov in the Russian SFSR with four scheduled stops and a final destination of Tbilisi in the Georgian SSR, after takeoff from Sochi (in Russia) on a short flight to Kutaisi (in Georgia), and impacted at Mount Rech in the Caucasus Mountains.
- Later in the day, Trans Australia Airlines Flight 538 crashed into the ocean off of Mackay, Queensland, while making its approach from Brisbane, killing all 29 people. The crash of the Fokker F-27 remains the worst loss of life in a civilian air crash in Australia; a 1943 crash of a B-17 bomber killed 40 people.
- In Tokyo, U.S. President Eisenhower's Press Secretary, James C. Hagerty, appointments secretary Thomas E. Stephens, and U.S. Ambassador to Japan Douglas MacArthur II had their car surrounded by an angry mob, and were trapped inside for an hour and a half before a U.S. Marine helicopter rescued them. Eisenhower set off on his tour of the Far East the next day and refused to postpone his trip to Japan.
- June 10, 1960, had been the scheduled date for President Eisenhower to arrive in Moscow to begin a tour of the Soviet Union, but the plans were cancelled in May 1960 following the U-2 Incident.

== June 11, 1960 (Saturday) ==
- An opera based on A Midsummer Night's Dream, created by Benjamin Britten and Peter Pears from the play by William Shakespeare, had its first performance.
- Thirty people at a wedding reception in Multan in Pakistan, were killed in the collapse of a roof.
- Born: Mehmet Oz, known professionally as Dr. Oz, American television presenter, physician, author, professor emeritus of cardiothoracic surgery at Columbia University, and former political candidate; in Cleveland, Ohio

== June 12, 1960 (Sunday) ==
- Elections began in Lebanon, and for the first time, the secret ballot was made available to voters, a reform implemented after the 1957 elections were tainted with fraud. Voting for the 99 member parliament, which reserved 55 seats for Christians and 44 for Moslems, was conducted over four Sundays. Saeb Salam, leader of the Phalangists (Kataeb Party), became Prime Minister in August.

== June 13, 1960 (Monday) ==
- A Japanese midget submarine that had been sunk by depth charges near Pearl Harbor on December 7, 1941, was discovered after more than 18 years. The two-man I-18 was raised by the USS Current on July 6 and then returned to Japan.

== June 14, 1960 (Tuesday) ==
- Pacific Northern Airlines Flight 201 flew into the side of Mount Gilbert (Alaska), killing all 14 people on board.

== June 15, 1960 (Wednesday) ==
- Thousands of protesters in Japan, angry over Japan's ratification of the security treaty with the United States, stormed into the parliament building and clashed with police. One female student, Michiko Kanba, was killed, and more than 600 students were injured. Nationwide an estimated 5.8 million people participated in demonstrations. U.S. President Eisenhower cancelled a planned (June 19) visit to Tokyo at the request of Japan's Prime Minister Nobusuke Kishi.
- A heat burst occurred near the resort of Lake Whitney, Texas, shortly after midnight, followed by a windstorm. Despite later claims that, from 80 degrees, the temperature rose to nearly 140 °F", contemporary accounts at the time reported a peak of 95°.
- The eight-month-long strike by the Writers Guild of America ended with a settlement that the writers would later regret, with the right to residuals on old films being given up in return for health and pension benefits.
- BC Ferries, the second largest ferry operator in the world, started service with two ships, the M.V. Tsawwassen and the M.V. Sidney, operating between Tsawwassen and Swartz Bay.
- TIROS-1, launched on April 1 as the first weather satellite, stopped transmitting.

== June 16, 1960 (Thursday) ==
- Portuguese colonial troops killed more than 600 Mozambican people as they fired into a crowd of black Africans who were protesting for the independence of Portuguese East Africa. In 1975, Portugal would finally allow the nation to become independent as Mozambique.
- The proposed Twenty-third Amendment to the United States Constitution was approved by the U.S. Senate, two days after it had passed the House, and submitted to the states for ratification. Sponsored by Congressman Emanuel Cellar of New York, the amendment granted the District of Columbia three electoral votes, allowing D.C. residents to vote in presidential elections, and was ratified by March 29, 1961.
- Psycho, directed by Alfred Hitchcock and starring Anthony Perkins as the killer at the Bates Motel, had its premiere, at two cinemas in New York City, the DeMille and the Baronet.
- Born: Peter Sterling ("Sterlo"), Australian rugby league star; in Toowoomba, Queensland
  - Lee Hye-gyeong, South Korean writer (d. 2026).

== June 17, 1960 (Friday) ==
- Ted Williams of the Boston Red Sox hit his 500th home run, in a game at Cleveland, off of Indians' pitcher Wynn Hawkins. Williams was only the fourth person to reach the milestone, after Babe Ruth, Jimmie Foxx and Mel Ott. Twenty-three others have hit 500 homers as of 2015.
- Communists won the elections to the leadership of the Iraqi Cigarette Workers Union. However, the government authorities refused to acknowledge the result, and called for new elections.
- The new American Football League filed an antitrust lawsuit against the National Football League. Following trial, a court concluded that the NFL had not violated the law.
- El Rancho Vegas, which in 1941 became the first casino resort on what would become the Las Vegas Strip, burned down.
- Born: Thomas Haden Church, American actor; in Woodland, California

== June 18, 1960 (Saturday) ==
- "Freedomland", a theme park designed in the shape of the United States and billed (until a lawsuit) as "Disneyland of the East", was dedicated in the Bronx, and opened the next day.
- The Middleton Railway, at Leeds in England, became the first standard gauge line to be operated by volunteers.
- Atlas launch vehicle 50-D was delivered for the first Mercury-Atlas mission (MA-1).
- The first commencement of the University of Waterloo was held.

== June 19, 1960 (Sunday) ==
- In Moscow, KGB Chairman Aleksandr Shelepin secretly delivered a report to Soviet Premier Nikita Khrushchev, warning that, according to KGB sources in the U.S., "the chiefs at the Pentagon are hoping to launch a preventive war against the Soviet Union". Relying on the unconfirmed report, Khrushchev publicly stated 10 days later that the Soviets would use their own missiles if the U.S. attempted to invade Cuba.
- On his tour of the Far East, U.S. President Eisenhower encountered his first hostile reception, while visiting the island of Okinawa. A crowd of 1,500 protesters demonstrated in favor of the island's return from U.S. administration to Japan.
- Peñarol, the champion of Uruguay's soccer football league, won the first Copa Libertadores of South America, playing a 1 to 1 draw against Paraguayan champion Club Olimpia in Asunción, a week after a 1 to 0 win over Olimpia in Montevideo. With the award of the cup (now referred to as the Copa Libertadores) based upon the aggregate score, Peñarol had an overall 2 to 1 score against Club Olimpia. As the winner, it advanced to a two-game match against the European Cup champion (Real Madrid of Spain) in the first Intercontinental Cup.
- The Charlotte Motor Speedway opened in Concord, North Carolina, and hosted the first World 600 NASCAR race. Joe Lee Johnson won the first running of the 600.
- Died:
  - Alan Stacey, 26, English race car driver, was killed on the 26th lap of the Belgian Grand Prix when he was struck in the face by a flying bird while driving at 120 miles per hour (190 km/h), causing him to lose control and overturn in a fiery crash. Only six of the 17 starters were able to finish the race, won by Jack Brabham.
  - Chris Bristow, 22, English race car driver, viewed as a "future world champion", was killed on the 20th lap of the Belgian Grand Prix when he crashed and was thrown from his car.
  - Jimmy Bryan, 34, winner of the 1958 Indianapolis 500, was killed when he lost control of his car during a race at the Langhorne Speedway in Pennsylvania.

== June 20, 1960 (Monday) ==
- The Mali Federation, created in 1959 by a merger of the French Sudan and Senegal, was granted independence by France. Modibo Keïta was head of the Federation, and Léopold Sédar Senghor was Speaker of the National Assembly. The Federation existed for two months, until Senegal (led by Senghor) seceded on August 20. The former French Sudan then became the Republic of Mali, with Keita as its president.
- At New York's Polo Grounds, a crowd of 31,892 watched Floyd Patterson become the first person to regain the world heavyweight boxing championship. In the fifth round, Patterson knocked out champion Ingemar Johansson with a powerful left hook that left the Swedish boxer unconscious for ten minutes. Johansson then walked out under his own power.
- Crewed tests of the Mercury environmental control system began. The subjects were clothed in pressure suits and subjected to postlanding conditions for 12 hours without serious physiological effects.
- Nan Winton became the first national female newsreader on BBC television.
- Died:
  - John B. Kelly Sr., 70, athlete turned self-made millionaire, and father of Monaco's Princess Grace
  - William E. Fairbairn, 75, English soldier and hand-to-hand combat expert

== June 21, 1960 (Tuesday) ==
- A major oil discovery was made in the Tyumen Oblast of the Soviet Union, "heralding the beginning of western Siberian production on a large scale". Starting in 1964, petroleum from the Shaim Oil Field would be shipped on the Irtysh River to a refinery in Omsk.
- Armin Hary of West Germany became the first man to run 100 meters in 10.0 seconds. He was competing in an event in Zürich, Switzerland.
- Southeastern Illinois College was established in Harrisburg, Illinois, following a public referendum.
- The last operational B-29 bomber flew its final mission, a routine radar evaluation flight.
- The TV Western Colt .45 broadcast its final episode, after three seasons on ABC.

== June 22, 1960 (Wednesday) ==
- The first launch of two satellites from the same rocket (a Thor-Ablestar) took place at Cape Canaveral, as the United States placed a Transit II-A navigation satellite and a surveillance and solar observation satellite into space. Thirty minutes later, a spring-loaded device sent the two spheres into separate orbits. The United States Naval Research Laboratory SOLRAD 1 Galactic Radiation and Background program satellite served as the first successful U.S. reconnaissance satellite over the Soviet Union and returned the first real-time X-ray and ultraviolet observations of the Sun.
- All 54 people on board a Brazilian REAL airliner were killed when the Convair CV-340 crashed into Guanabara Bay while approaching Rio de Janeiro.
- A fire in a department store in Liverpool in England, killed 11 people.

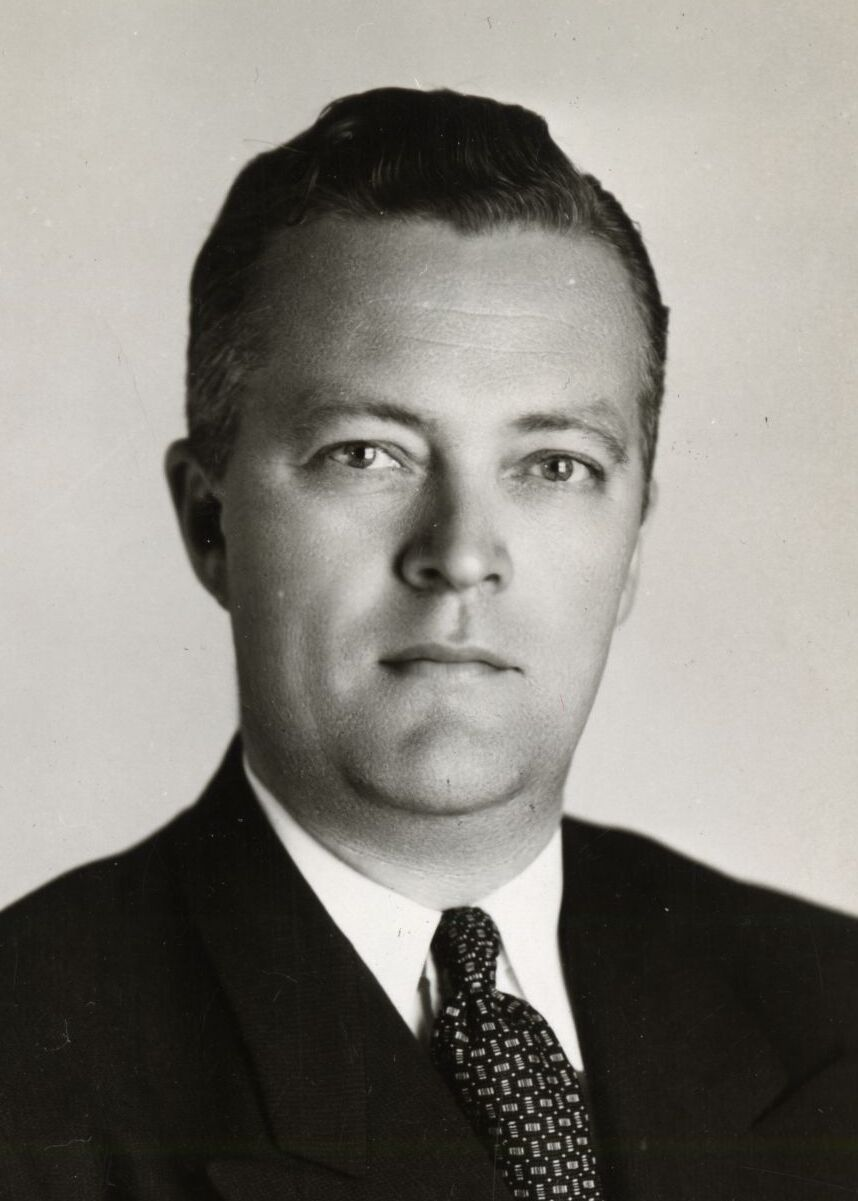
Lesage

- The "Quiet Revolution" in the historically conservative Canadian province of Quebec begain in legislative elections as Quebec Liberal Party leader Jean Lesage defeated the long-ruling Union Nationale that had been led by Maurice Duplessis for 15 years until his death in 1959. Lesage and the liberals had campaigned with the slogan "Il faut que ça change" ("Things have got to change").
- Born:
  - Erin Brockovich, American consumer advocate and environmental activist, later the subject of a film of the same name; in Lawrence, Kansas
  - Adam Schiff, U.S. Congressman for California since 2001, and Chair of the House Intelligence Committee; in Framingham, Massachusetts
  - Kenneth Pinyan, American advocate for zoophilia who died while having oral sex with a stallion in 2005, under the alias "Mr. Hands"

== June 23, 1960 (Thursday) ==
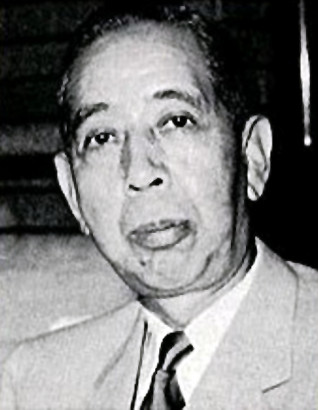
Kishi

- On the day that the unpopular U.S.-Japan Security Treaty went into effect, Japan's Prime Minister Nobusuke Kishi announced his resignation. Kishi was replaced by Ikeda Hayato.
- Rival Congolese leaders Joseph Kasavubu and Patrice Lumumba agreed to share power, with Kasavubu to become the former Belgian colony's first President, and Lumumba to become the nation's first Prime Minister.
- Enovid, the first FDA approved contraceptive drug, became available in pill form at pharmacies throughout the United States.
- Wilber Hardee founded his fast food chain, Hardee's. He opened his first namesake restaurant in Greenville, North Carolina, on September 3.

== June 24, 1960 (Friday) ==
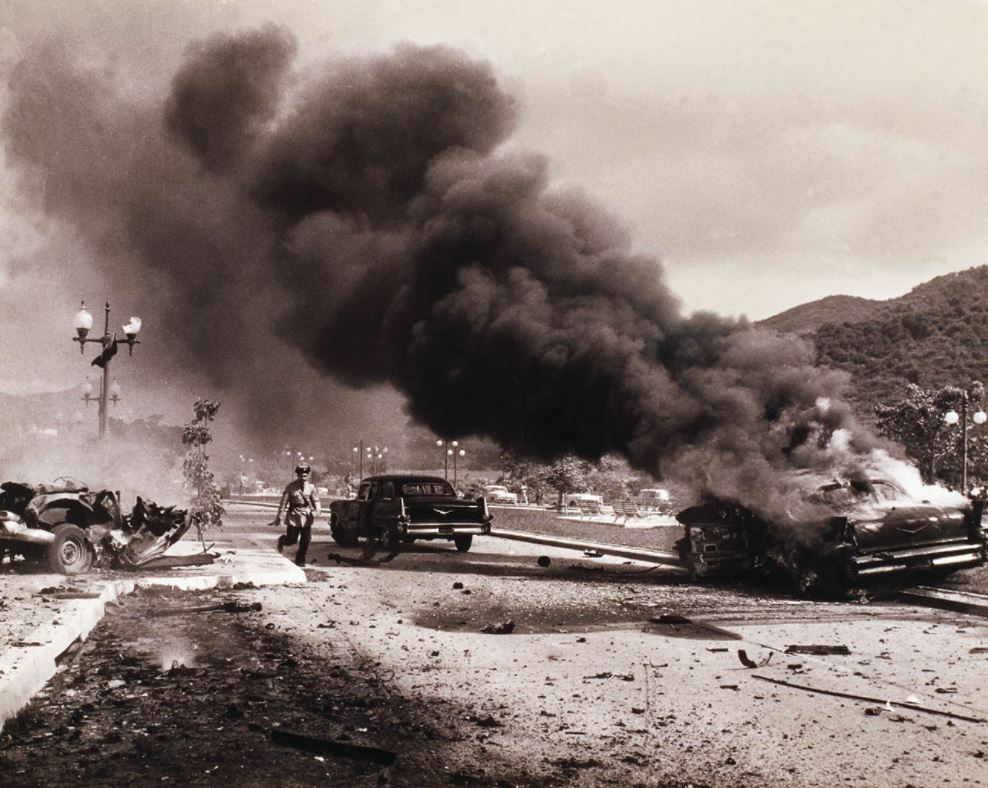
June 24, 1960: Car explodes in Paseo Los Próceres, Caracas, during the attempted assassination of Romulo Betancourt

- Romulo Betancourt, the President of Venezuela, was injured in an assassination attempt that was later traced back to Dominican Republic dictator Rafael Trujillo. As the presidential limousine drove through Caracas on Avenida de los Proceres, a bomb concealed inside a parked 1954 Oldsmobile was detonated. A bystander, and Betancourt's aide, Ramon Armas Perez, were fatally injured.
- All 54 people on board a Brazilian airliner, operated by REAL Transportes Aéreos were killed when the Convair CV-340 plane plunged into the sea while making its approach to Rio de Janeiro after a flight from Belo Horizonte.
- The Romance of Helen Trent, which had been a daytime soap opera on the CBS Radio Network since its debut on October 30, 1933, was broadcast for the 7,222nd and last time, ending a run of almost 27 years.
- Born:
  - Adel Abdel Bary, Egyptian al-Qaeda officer and plotter in the 1998 bombing of the United States Embassys in Kenya and Tanzania
  - Juli Inkster, American golfer and winner of seven championship tournaments; in Santa Cruz, California

== June 25, 1960 (Saturday) ==
- William H. Martin and Bernon F. Mitchell, two cryptologists with the National Security Agency, departed the United States for a vacation in Mexico, then flew the next day to Cuba and defected to the Soviet Union.
- The first talks between the government of France and the leadership of the Algerian rebel group, the FLN, took place in the Parisian suburb of Melun.
- Died: Sudhindranath Dutta, 59, Bengali Indian poet

== June 26, 1960 (Sunday) ==
- The Havana Sugar Kings played their last baseball game in Cuba, defeating the visiting Rochester Red Wings, 6–5, in the predominantly American International League. After the IL's All-Star break, the Havana team played at Buffalo and Richmond, and then transferred to Jersey City, New Jersey, before their game in Miami.
- The State of Somaliland, led by Prime Minister Muhammad Haji Ibrahim Egal, attained independence from the United Kingdom. On Friday, the former British Somaliland protectorate united with the UN Trust Territory in the former Somalia Italiana, to create the Somali Republic.
- The Malagasy Republic, located on the island of Madagascar, attained full independence from France, with Philibert Tsiranana as president.

== June 27, 1960 (Monday) ==
- Typhoon Olive struck the Philippines, killing 104 people and leaving more than 500 missing.
- Chlorophyll "A" was first synthesized, at Harvard University by Robert Burns Woodward. Woodward would receive the Nobel Prize in Chemistry in 1965.
- Best Seller, the last new daytime radio soap opera, premiered on the CBS Radio Network. It would be cancelled after five months, along with all other CBS Radio daytime programs, on November 25.
- Disarmament discussions in Paris came to an end when the Soviet Union and its allies withdrew from further talks. Talking resumed in March 1962.
- Jamaican and British soldiers and policemen arrested 100 members of the First Africa Corps, a Rastafarian group, ending its influence in Jamaica.
- "Project Orbit" was established as a complement in the U.S. to the Mercury spacecraft reliability program, with one production spacecraft to be withdrawn from operation for extensive testing of vacuum, heat, and vibration conditions. This test series was later designated
- Born: Michael Mayer, American theatre director; in Bethesda, Maryland
- Died:
  - Lottie Dod, 88, English tennis player; Wimbledon women's champion, 1887–1888 and 1891–1893
  - Harry Pollitt, 70, General Secretary, 1929–1956, of Communist Party of Great Britain
  - Ivan Matetić Ronjgov, 80, Croatian composer

== June 28, 1960 (Tuesday) ==
- Lightning strikes started 143 separate fires across Arizona and New Mexico, the most recorded in a single day.
- An explosion at Six Bells Colliery at Monmouthshire in Wales killed 45 coal miners.
- The University of Novi Sad was founded in Yugoslavia.
- Born: John Elway, American NFL quarterback for the Denver Broncos; in Port Angeles, Washington

== June 29, 1960 (Wednesday) ==
- Cuba nationalized the Texaco oil refinery in Santiago de Cuba, after the corporation refused to process Soviet petroleum. The seizure of Esso of Cuba and Shell Oil refineries followed two days later.
- The first weather satellite, TIROS, was shut down by NASA after 78 days, 1,302 orbits, and almost 23,000 weather photos.
- The BBC Television Centre was opened in London.

== June 30, 1960 (Thursday) ==
- At 12:01 a.m. (0101 GMT), the Belgian Congo was proclaimed independent by King Baudouin of Belgium. The new Congolese Prime Minister, Patrice Lumumba, then delivered an angry speech about colonial rule. Two days later, the first rioting began, followed by an army mutiny and civil war.
- Lionel Bart's musical, Oliver!, based on the 1838 Charles Dickens novel Oliver Twist, was presented for the first time. The debut on London's West End was joined by a Broadway production on January 6, 1963.
- Mercury Spacecraft No. 2 was delivered to the Marshall Space Flight Center, Huntsville, Alabama, for compatibility tests with the Redstone launch vehicle and was shipped to Cape Canaveral on July 23, 1960.
- Born:
  - Murray Cook, Australian DJ and former musician for The Wiggles; in Cowra, New South Wales
  - Lunna (stage name for Maria Socorro Garcia de la Noceda), Puerto Rican singer; in Ponce
