= Boole's inequality =

Inequality applying to probability spaces

In probability theory, Boole's inequality, also known as the union bound, says that for any finite or countable set of events, the probability that at least one of the events happens is no greater than the sum of the probabilities of the individual events. Formally, for a countable set of events A_{1}, A_{2}, A_{3}, ..., we have

$${\mathbb P}\left(\bigcup_{i=1}^{\infty} A_i \right) \le \sum_{i=1}^{\infty} {\mathbb P}(A_i).$$

In measure-theoretic terms, Boole's inequality is an instance of the countable subadditivity of measures. Consequently, it holds not only for probability measures ${\mathbb P}$, but for arbitrary measures.

Boole's inequality is named after George Boole.

== Proofs ==
=== Proof by induction ===
For finite collections of events, Boole's inequality can be proved by induction. First, for any event $A_1$, one trivially has

$$\mathbb P(A_1) \le \mathbb P(A_1).$$

Next, assume that the inequality holds for any collection of $n$ events, and consider n+1 events $A_1, \ldots, A_n.$ By the induction hypothesis, we have

$${\mathbb P}\left(\bigcup_{i=1}^{n} A_i \right) \le \sum_{i=1}^{n} {\mathbb P}(A_i).$$

By applying the equality $\mathbb P(A \cup B) = \mathbb P(A) + \mathbb{P}(B) - \mathbb{P}(A \cap B),$ to $A = A_1 \cup \cdots \cup A_n$ and $B = A_{n+1},$ we get

$$\mathbb{P}\left(\bigcup_{i=1}^{n+1}A_i\right) = \mathbb{P}\left(\bigcup_{i=1}^n A_i\right) + \mathbb{P}(A_{n+1}) -\mathbb{P}\left(\bigcup_{i=1}^n A_i \cap A_{n+1}\right).$$

Since, by the first axiom of probability,

$${\mathbb P}\left(\bigcup_{i=1}^n A_i \cap A_{n+1}\right) \ge 0,$$

we have

$$\mathbb{P}\left(\bigcup_{i=1}^{n+1} A_i \right) \le \mathbb{P} \left(\bigcup_{i=1}^n A_i\right) + \mathbb{P}(A_{n+1}),$$

and therefore

$$\mathbb{P}\left(\bigcup_{i=1}^{n+1} A_i \right) \le \sum_{i=1}^{n} \mathbb{P}(A_i) + \mathbb{P}(A_{n+1}) = \sum_{i=1}^{n+1} \mathbb{P}(A_i).$$

The countable version of Boole's inequality can then be deduced from its finite version by taking n to infinity and using the continuity from below of probability measures.

=== Proof without using induction ===
Let events $A_1, A_2, A_3, \dots$in our probability space be given. The countable additivity of the measure $\mathbb{P}$ states that if $B_1, B_2, B_3, \dots$ are pairwise disjoint events, then

$$\mathbb{P}\left(\bigcup_{i} B_i\right) = \sum_i \mathbb P(B_i).$$

Set

$$B_i := A_i - \bigcup^{i-1}_{j=1} A_j.$$

Then $B_1, B_2, B_3, \dots$ are pairwise disjoint. We claim that:

$$\bigcup^{\infty}_{i=1} A_i = \bigcup^{\infty}_{i=1} B_i.$$

One inclusion is clear. Indeed, since $B_i \subset A_i$ for all i, thus $\bigcup^{\infty}_{i=1} B_i \subset \bigcup^{\infty}_{i=1} A_i$.

For the other inclusion, let $x \in \bigcup^{\infty}_{i=1} A_i$ be given. Write $k$ for the minimum positive integer such that $x \in A_k$. Then $x \in A_k - \bigcup^{k-1}_{j=1} A_j = B_k$. Thus $x \in \bigcup^{\infty}_{i=1} B_i$. Therefore $\bigcup^{\infty}_{i=1} A_i \subset \bigcup^{\infty}_{i=1} B_i$.

Therefore

$$\mathbb P\left(\bigcup_iA_i\right) = \mathbb P\left(\bigcup_iB_i\right) = \sum_i \mathbb P (B_i) \leq \sum_i \mathbb P(A_i),$$

where the last inequality holds because $B_i \subset A_i$ implies that $\mathbb P (B_i) \leq \mathbb P(A_i),$ for all i.

== Bonferroni inequalities ==
Boole's inequality for a finite number of events may be generalized to certain upper and lower bounds on the probability of finite unions of events. These bounds are known as Bonferroni inequalities, after Carlo Emilio Bonferroni; see Bonferroni (1936).

Let

$$S_1 := \sum_{i=1}^n {\mathbb P}(A_i), \quad S_2 := \sum_{1\le i_1 < i_2\le n} {\mathbb P}(A_{i_1} \cap A_{i_2} ),\quad \ldots,\quad S_k := \sum_{1\le i_1<\cdots<i_k\le n} {\mathbb P}(A_{i_1}\cap \cdots \cap A_{i_k} )$$

for all integers k in {1, ..., n}.

Then, when $K \leq n$ is odd:

$$\sum_{j=1}^K (-1)^{j-1} S_j \geq \mathbb{P}\Big(\bigcup_{i=1}^n A_i\Big) = \sum_{j=1}^n  (-1)^{j-1} S_j$$

holds, and when $K \leq n$ is even:

$$\sum_{j=1}^K (-1)^{j-1} S_j \leq \mathbb{P}\Big(\bigcup_{i=1}^n A_i\Big) = \sum_{j=1}^n  (-1)^{j-1} S_j$$

holds.

The inequalities follow from the inclusion–exclusion principle, and Boole's inequality is the special case of $K=1$. Since the proof of the inclusion-exclusion principle requires only the finite additivity (and nonnegativity) of $\mathbb{P}$, the Bonferroni inequalities holds more generally when $\mathbb{P}$ is replaced by any finite content, in the sense of measure theory.

=== Proof for odd K ===
Let $E = \bigcap_{i=1}^n B_i$, where $B_i \in \{A_i, A_i^c\}$ for each $i = 1, \dots, n$. These such $E$ partition the sample space, and for each $E$ and every $i$, $E$ is either contained in $A_i$ or disjoint from it.

If $E = \bigcap_{i=1}^n A_i^c$, then $E$ contributes 0 to both sides of the inequality.

Otherwise, assume $E$ is contained in exactly $L$ of the $A_i$. Then $E$ contributes exactly $\mathbb{P}(E)$ to the right side of the inequality, while it contributes

$$\sum_{j=1}^K (-1)^{j-1} {L \choose j} \mathbb{P}(E)$$

to the left side of the inequality. However, by Pascal's rule, this is equal to

$$\sum_{j=1}^K (-1)^{j-1} \Big({L-1 \choose j-1} + {L-1 \choose j} \Big)\mathbb{P}(E)$$

which telescopes to

$$\Big( 1 + {L-1 \choose K}\Big) \mathbb{P}(E) \geq \mathbb{P}(E)$$

Thus, the inequality holds for all events $E$, and so by summing over $E$, we obtain the desired inequality:

$$\sum_{j=1}^K (-1)^{j-1} S_j \geq \mathbb{P}\Big(\bigcup_{i=1}^n A_i\Big)$$

The proof for even $K$ is nearly identical.

=== Example ===
Suppose that you are estimating five parameters based on a random sample, and you can control each parameter separately. If you want your estimations of all five parameters to be good with a chance 95%, what should you do to each parameter?

Tuning each parameter's chance to be good to within 95% is not enough because "all are good" is a subset of each event "Estimate i is good". We can use Boole's Inequality to solve this problem. By finding the complement of event "all five are good", we can change this question into another condition:

P(at least one estimation is bad) = 0.05 ≤ P(A_{1} is bad) + P(A_{2} is bad) + P(A_{3} is bad) + P(A_{4} is bad) + P(A_{5} is bad)

One way is to make each of them equal to 0.05/5 = 0.01, that is 1%. In other words, you have to guarantee each estimate good to 99%( for example, by constructing a 99% confidence interval) to make sure the total estimation to be good with a chance 95%. This is called the Bonferroni Method of simultaneous inference.

== See also ==
- Diluted inclusion–exclusion principle
- Schuette–Nesbitt formula
- Boole–Fréchet inequalities
- Probability of the union of pairwise independent events

== Other related articles ==
- Bonferroni, Carlo E. (1936), "Teoria statistica delle classi e calcolo delle probabilità", Pubbl. D. R. Ist. Super. Di Sci. Econom. E Commerciali di Firenze (in Italian), 8: 1–62, Zbl 0016.41103
- Dohmen, Klaus (2003), Improved Bonferroni Inequalities via Abstract Tubes. Inequalities and Identities of Inclusion–Exclusion Type, Lecture Notes in Mathematics, vol. 1826, Berlin: Springer-Verlag, pp. viii+113, ISBN 3-540-20025-8, MR 2019293, Zbl 1026.05009
- Galambos, János; Simonelli, Italo (1996), Bonferroni-Type Inequalities with Applications, Probability and Its Applications, New York: Springer-Verlag, pp. x+269, ISBN 0-387-94776-0, MR 1402242, Zbl 0869.60014
- Galambos, János (1977), "Bonferroni inequalities", Annals of Probability, 5 (4): 577–581, doi:10.1214/aop/1176995765, JSTOR 2243081, MR 0448478, Zbl 0369.60018
- Galambos, János (2001) [1994], "Bonferroni inequalities", Encyclopedia of Mathematics, EMS Press
