= Pairwise independence =

Set of random variables of which any two are independent

In probability theory, a pairwise independent collection of random variables is a set of random variables any two of which are independent. Any collection of mutually independent random variables is pairwise independent, but some pairwise independent collections are not mutually independent. Pairwise independent random variables with finite variance are uncorrelated.

A pair of random variables X and Y are independent if and only if the random vector (X, Y) with joint cumulative distribution function (CDF) $F_{X,Y}(x,y)$ satisfies

$$F_{X,Y}(x,y) = F_X(x) F_Y(y),$$

or equivalently, their joint density $f_{X,Y}(x,y)$ satisfies

$$f_{X,Y}(x,y) = f_X(x) f_Y(y).$$

That is, the joint distribution is equal to the product of the marginal distributions.

Unless it is not clear in context, in practice the modifier "mutual" is usually dropped so that independence means mutual independence. A statement such as " X, Y, Z are independent random variables" means that X, Y, Z are mutually independent.

== Example ==
Pairwise independence does not imply mutual independence, as shown by the following example attributed to S. Bernstein.

Suppose X and Y are two independent tosses of a fair coin, where we designate 1 for heads and 0 for tails. Let the third random variable Z be equal to 1 if exactly one of those coin tosses resulted in "heads", and 0 otherwise (i.e., $Z = X \oplus Y$). Then jointly the triple (X, Y, Z) has the following probability distribution:

$$(X,Y,Z) = \begin{cases}
(0,0,0) & \text{with probability}\ 1/4, \\
(0,1,1) & \text{with probability}\ 1/4, \\
(1,0,1) & \text{with probability}\ 1/4, \\
(1,1,0) & \text{with probability}\ 1/4.
\end{cases}$$

Here the marginal probability distributions are identical: $f_X(0) = f_Y(0) = f_Z(0) = 1/2,$ and $f_X(1) = f_Y(1) = f_Z(1) = 1/2.$ The bivariate distributions also agree: $f_{X,Y} = f_{X,Z} = f_{Y,Z},$ where $f_{X,Y}(0,0)=f_{X,Y}(0,1)=f_{X,Y}(1,0)=f_{X,Y}(1,1)=1/4.$

Since each of the pairwise joint distributions equals the product of their respective marginal distributions, the variables are pairwise independent:

- X and Y are independent, and
- X and Z are independent, and
- Y and Z are independent.

However, X, Y, and Z are not mutually independent, since $f_{X,Y,Z}(x,y,z) \neq f_X(x)f_Y(y)f_Z(z),$ the left side equalling for example 1/4 for (x, y, z) = (0, 0, 0) while the right side equals 1/8 for (x, y, z) = (0, 0, 0). In fact, any of $\{X,Y,Z\}$ is completely determined by the other two (any of X, Y, Z is the sum (modulo 2) of the others). That is as far from independence as random variables can get.

== Probability of the union of pairwise independent events ==
Bounds on the probability that the sum of Bernoulli random variables is at least one, commonly known as the union bound, are provided by the Boole–Fréchet inequalities. While these bounds assume only univariate information, several bounds with knowledge of general bivariate probabilities, have been proposed too. Denote by $\{{A}_i, i \in \{1,2,...,n\}\}$ a set of $n$ Bernoulli events with probability of occurrence $\mathbb{P}(A_{i})=p_i$ for each $i$. Suppose the bivariate probabilities are given by $\mathbb{P}(A_{i} \cap A_{j})=p_{ij}$ for every pair of indices $(i,j)$. Kounias derived the following upper bound:
$$\mathbb{P}(\displaystyle {\cup}_iA_{i}) \leq \displaystyle \sum_{i=1}^n p_{i}-\underset {j\in \{1,2,..,n\}}{\max} \sum_{i\neq j} p_{ij},$$
which subtracts the maximum weight of a star spanning tree on a complete graph with $n$ nodes (where the edge weights are given by $p_{ij}$) from the sum of the marginal probabilities $\sum_i p_i$.
Hunter-Worsley tightened this upper bound by optimizing over $\tau \in T$ as follows:
$$\mathbb{P}(\displaystyle {\cup}_i A_{i}) \leq \displaystyle \sum_{i=1}^n p_{i}-\underset {\tau \in T}{\max}\sum_{(i,j) \in \tau} p_{ij},$$
where $T$ is the set of all spanning trees on the graph. These bounds are not the tightest possible with general bivariates $p_{ij}$ even when feasibility is guaranteed as shown in Boros et.al. However, when the variables are pairwise independent ($p_{ij}=p_ip_j$), Ramachandra—Natarajan showed that the Kounias-Hunter-Worsley bound is tight by proving that the maximum probability of the union of events admits a closed-form expression given as:

$$\max \mathbb{P}(\displaystyle {\cup}_i A_{i})  =  \displaystyle \min\left(\sum_{i=1}^n p_i - p_n \left(\sum_{i=1}^{n-1} p_{i}\right),1\right)$$	1

where the probabilities are sorted in increasing order as $0 \leq p_1 \leq p_2 \leq \ldots \leq p_n \leq 1$. The tight bound in Eq. 1 depends only on the sum of the smallest $n-1$ probabilities $\sum_{i=1}^{n-1} p_{i}$ and the largest probability $p_n$. Thus, while ordering of the probabilities plays a role in the derivation of the bound, the ordering among the smallest $n-1$ probabilities $\{p_1,p_2,\dots,p_{n-1}\}$ is inconsequential since only their sum is used.

=== Comparison with the Boole–Fréchet union bound ===
It is useful to compare the smallest bounds on the probability of the union with arbitrary dependence and pairwise independence respectively. The tightest Boole–Fréchet upper union bound (assuming only univariate information) is given as:

$$\displaystyle \max \mathbb{P}(\displaystyle {\cup}_i A_{i}) = \displaystyle \min\left(\sum_{i=1}^n p_{i},1\right)$$	2

As shown in Ramachandra-Natarajan, it can be easily verified that the ratio of the two tight bounds in Eq. 2 and Eq. 1 is upper bounded by $4/3$ where the maximum value of $4/3$ is attained when
$$\sum_{i=1}^{n-1} p_i = 1/2 \, , \quad p_n=1/2$$
where the probabilities are sorted in increasing order as $0 \leq p_1 \leq p_2 \leq \dots \leq p_n \leq 1$. In other words, in the best-case scenario, the pairwise independence bound in Eq. 1 provides an improvement of $25\%$ over the univariate bound in Eq. 2.

== Generalization ==
More generally, we can talk about k-wise independence, for any k ≥ 2. The idea is similar: a set of random variables is k-wise independent if every subset of size k of those variables is independent. k-wise independence has been used in theoretical computer science, where it was used to prove a theorem about the problem MAXEkSAT.

k-wise independence is used in the proof that k-independent hashing functions are secure unforgeable message authentication codes.

== See also ==
- Pairwise
- Disjoint sets
