= Reduction criterion =

In quantum information theory, the reduction criterion is a necessary condition a mixed state must satisfy in order for it to be separable. In other words, the reduction criterion is a separability criterion. It was first proved and independently formulated in 1999. Violation of the reduction criterion is closely related to the distillability of the state in question.

== Details ==
Let H_{1} and H_{2} be Hilbert spaces of finite dimensions n and m respectively. L(H_{i}) will denote the space of linear operators acting on H_{i}. Consider a bipartite quantum system whose state space is the tensor product

$$H = H_1 \otimes H_2.$$

An (un-normalized) mixed state ρ is a positive linear operator (density matrix) acting on H.

A linear map Φ: L(H_{2}) → L(H_{1}) is said to be positive if it preserves the cone of positive elements, i.e. A is positive implied Φ(A) is also.

From the one-to-one correspondence between positive maps and entanglement witnesses, we have that a state ρ is entangled if and only if there exists a positive map Φ such that

$$(I \otimes \Phi)(\rho)$$

is not positive. Therefore, if ρ is separable, then for all positive map Φ,

$$(I \otimes \Phi)(\rho) \geq 0.$$

Thus every positive, but not completely positive, map Φ gives rise to a necessary condition for separability in this way. The reduction criterion is a particular example of this.

Suppose H_{1} = H_{2}. Define the positive map Φ: L(H_{2}) → L(H_{1}) by

$$\Phi(A) = \operatorname{Tr}A - A.$$

It is known that Φ is positive but not completely positive. So a mixed state ρ being separable implies

$$(I \otimes \Phi) (\rho) \geq 0.$$

Direct calculation shows that the above expression is the same as

$$I \otimes \rho_1 - \rho \geq 0$$

where ρ_{1} is the partial trace of ρ with respect to the second system. The dual relation

$$\rho_2 \otimes I - \rho \geq 0$$

is obtained in the analogous fashion. The reduction criterion consists of the above two inequalities.

== Connection with Fréchet bounds ==
The above last two inequalities together with lower bounds for ρ can be seen as quantum Fréchet inequalities, that is as the quantum analogous of the classical Fréchet probabilistic bounds, that hold for separable quantum states. The upper bounds are the previous ones $I \otimes \rho_1 \geq \rho$, $\rho_2 \otimes I \geq \rho$, and the lower bounds are the obvious constraint $\rho \geq 0$ together with $\rho \geq I \otimes \rho_1 + \rho_2 \otimes I -I$, where $I$ are identity matrices of suitable dimensions. The lower bounds have been obtained in. These bounds are satisfied by separable density matrices, while entangled states can violate them. Entangled states exhibit a form of stochastic dependence stronger than the strongest classical dependence and in fact they violate Fréchet like bounds. It is also worth mentioning that is possible to give a Bayesian interpretation of these bounds.
