= July 1960 =

Month of 1960

<<	July 1960					>>
Su	Mo	Tu	We	Th	Fr	Sa
					1	2
3	4	5	6	7	8	9
10	11	12	13	14	15	16
17	18	19	20	21	22	23
24	25	26	27	28	29	30
31

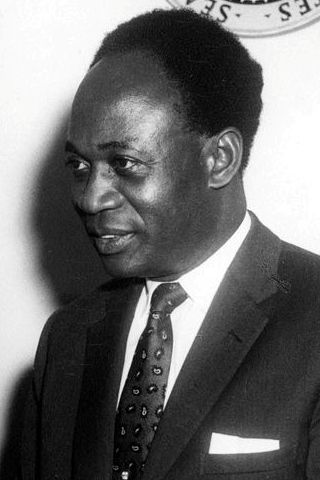
July 1, 1960: Kwame Nkrumah becomes President of newly independent Ghana

July 4, 1960: The 50-star U.S. flag becomes official

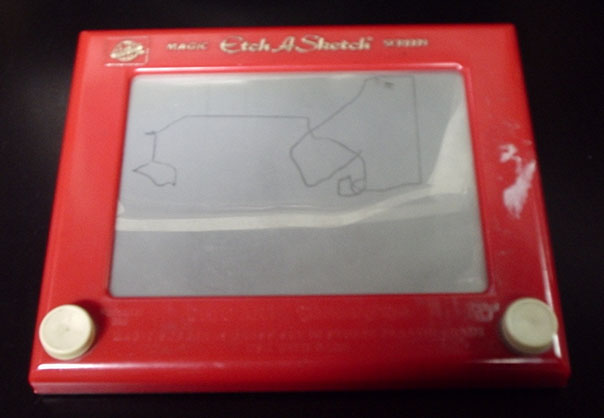
July 12, 1960: The Etch A Sketch toy introduced

The following events occurred in July 1960:

== July 1, 1960 (Friday) ==
- The Belgian Congo became independent with the name République du Congo (Republic of Congo), the same name that the former French Congo had assumed in 1958. To prevent confusion while acknowledging their independence, the two nations would be distinguished in the press by their national capitals, with the former Belgian colony being called "Congo-Leopoldville" and its neighbor "Congo-Brazzaville". In 1964, Congo-Leopoldville was officially given its current name, "République démocratique du Congo" (Democratic Republic of Congo).
- Italian Somaliland gained its independence from Italy, five days after British Somaliland, and merged into the Somali Republic. Aden Abdullah Othman, leader of the Italian Somaliland legislature, was elected president, and Abdirashid Ali Shermake became prime minister.
- A Soviet MiG fighter north of Murmansk in the Barents Sea shot down a 6-man RB-47. Two United States Air Force officers, First Lts. John R. McKone and Freeman B. Olmstead, survived and were imprisoned in Moscow's Lubyanka prison. The pilot, Major Willard Palm, was killed and his body recovered. The Soviets announced the capture of the men ten days later. The men were finally released on January 25, 1961. The fate of the other three crewmen was not revealed by the Soviet Union.

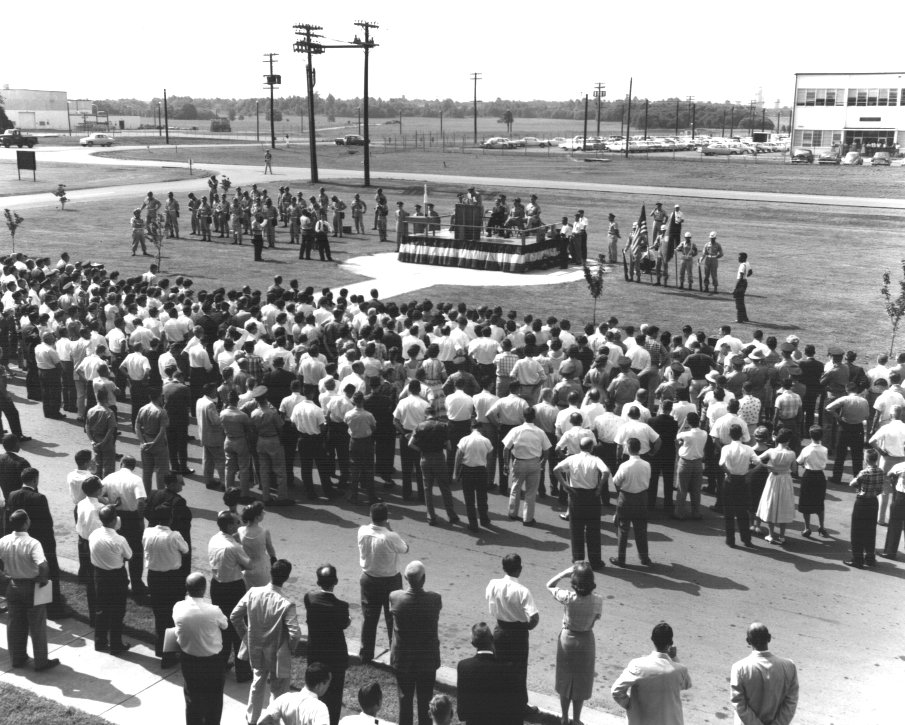
July 1, 1960: Transfer ceremony at Marshall Space Flight Center

- The Army Ballistic Missile Agency at Redstone Arsenal in Huntsville, Alabama, became the Marshall Space Flight Center, a field center of the civilian National Aeronautics and Space Administration. Wernher von Braun was the center's first director.
- In front of a crowd of more than 10,000 spectators, Captain Antony Easterbrook of the UK's Royal Marines fell 85 feet (26 m) to his death when a coupling link failed as he performed a "death slide" during a military tattoo at Madison Square Garden in New York City.
- Ghana became a republic, with Prime Minister Kwame Nkrumah as its first President. The Earl of Listowel had served on behalf of Queen Elizabeth II as Governor-General of Ghana.

== July 2, 1960 (Saturday) ==
- Former U.S. President Harry S. Truman said at a news conference in Independence, Missouri, that Democratic Party frontrunner John F. Kennedy lacked the maturity to be president, and that Kennedy should decline the nomination. Kennedy responded two days later, saying "I have encountered and survived every kind of hazard and opposition, and I do not intend to withdraw my name now, on the eve of the convention."
- A riot broke out during the Newport Jazz Festival in Newport, Rhode Island, after a crowd of about 3,000 people, mostly white, were angry about a lack of seating for the concerts. Order was not restored until three companies of the state National Guard were sent in.
- Born: Joanna Helbin, Polish archer; in Prudnik

== July 3, 1960 (Sunday) ==
- A bolt of lightning struck a group of religious pilgrims as they carried a statue of the Virgin Mary to the summit of Mount Bisalta, near Cuneo in Italy. Four were killed and 30 more injured.
- The French Grand Prix was held at Reims-Gueux and won by Jack Brabham.
- Born: Vince Clarke, English synth-pop musician and songwriter; in South Woodford, Essex

== July 4, 1960 (Monday) ==
- For the first time, a 50-star flag of the United States was hoisted, raised at 12:01 a.m. (EDT), at the Fort McHenry National Monument in Baltimore, and at the U.S. Capitol in Washington. At the time, there were only seven places in the United States where the national flag was permitted to be flown during hours of darkness.

== July 5, 1960 (Tuesday) ==
- Lyndon B. Johnson of Texas, the U.S. Senate Majority Leader, announced that he would seek, and expected that he would receive, the presidential nomination at the upcoming Democratic National Convention. Johnson asserted that front-runner John F. Kennedy had less than 600 of the required 701 delegates needed for a nomination, and that Johnson had at least 500. The only other candidate for the nomination was Senator Stuart Symington.
- The "Congo Crisis" began as the army in the newly independent "Congo-Leopoldville", formerly Belgian Congo as Congolese soldiers mutinied after the Belgian commander, Lt. Gen. Émile Janssens, tried to enforce discipline. European civilians fled from Léopoldville as the soldiers began attacking Europeans at random.

== July 6, 1960 (Wednesday) ==
- The United States cut its orders for sugar from Cuba by 95 percent, following a July 2 authorization by Congress giving President Eisenhower the power to decrease the quota of sugar purchases.
- Bhumibol Adulyadej, King of Thailand, became the first monarch in history to ride on the New York City Subway.
- The crash of a U.S. Navy blimp killed 18 men off of the coast of Barnegat Light, New Jersey.
- Died: Aneurin Bevan, 62, Welsh politician, British Minister of Health (1945–51), and chief architect of the UK's National Health Service.

== July 7, 1960 (Thursday) ==
- In one of the most shocking cases in the history of Australia, 8-year-old Graeme Thorne was kidnapped and murdered by Stephen Bradley. He demanded a ransom of £25,000 after his parents, Bazil and Freda, won in a lottery over a month prior. On August 16, nearly six weeks after the kidnapping, Sydney police would discover Thorne's body wrapped around a blue tartan picnic blanket and tied with string. On October 10, Bradley was captured by two Sydney policemen, Sergeants Brian Doyle and Jack Bateman, who were waiting for him on the SS Himalaya while it was docked at Colombo, Ceylon. He was extradited back to Australia where he was sentenced to penal servitude for life. Bradley would later die of a heart attack in 1968 in the Goulburn Correctional Centre while playing in a gaol tennis competition.
- The Antarctica Service Medal was established by the United States Congress under Public Law 600 of the 86th Congress.
- Police fired on a crowd of Italian demonstrators in Reggio Emilia, killing five people and injuring 30.

== July 8, 1960 (Friday) ==
- The Havana Sugar Kings minor league baseball team, part of the AAA International League (IL), was ordered moved to Jersey City, New Jersey, by IL Commissioner Frank Shaughnessy.
- Born:
  - Mal Meninga, Australian Rugby League player; in Bundaberg, Queensland
  - Yann LeCun, French computer scientist; in Soisy-sous-Montmorency
- Died: Werner Meyer-Eppler, 47, German physicist and pioneer in electronic speech synthesis

== July 9, 1960 (Saturday) ==
- Rodger Woodward, a seven-year-old boy, became the first person known to survive an accidental plunge over Niagara Falls. Roger had been a passenger in a boat on the Niagara River when the outboard motor failed. He fell 165 feet (50 m) over the Falls, but sustained only minor bruises and a cut, and was released from a hospital two days later.
- The nuclear submarine USS Thresher was launched. It would be lost in 1963.
- Major General Leighton I. Davis was appointed Department of Defense representative for Project Mercury support, replacing Major General Donald N. Yates.
- As the Congo Crisis continued, the Belgian national airline Sabena began airlifting Belgian citizens out of the Congo. Over the next three weeks, 25,711 flew home.

== July 10, 1960 (Sunday) ==
- The Eritrean Liberation Front was founded, with the goal of liberating Eritrea from the rule of Ethiopia.
- In Paris, the Soviet Union beat Yugoslavia in extra time on Viktor Ponedelnik's goal, to win the first UEFA European Football Championship, 2–1.
- The Havana Sugar Kings played their last game under that name, winning in Richmond and defeating the Virginians, 7–1. The next day, they played in Miami as the "Jersey City Jerseys", though still wearing their Sugar Kings uniforms.
- Born:
  - Ariel Castro, Puerto Rican-American kidnapper, musician and former bus driver (d. 2013); in Duey, Yauco, Puerto Rico
  - Lean Alejandro, Filipino nationalist leader (d. 1987); in Navotas, Rizal

== July 11, 1960 (Monday) ==
Flag of Katanga

- Moise Tshombe declared the Congolese province of Katanga independent, and, taking advantage of the Congo Crisis and the dismissal of Belgian officers from the Congolese Army, asked for military aid from Belgium. The Congo's Prime Minister Patrice Lumumba asked the United Nations to intervene in the crisis.
- Uttar Pradesh Agricultural University, located at Pantnagar in the Uttar Pradesh state in India, conducted its first classes. It was renamed Govind Ballabh Pant University in 1972.
- A U.S. Navy C-47 cargo transport plane crashed into the side of a mountain near Quito, Ecuador, killing all 18 people on board.
- Harper Lee's classic novel To Kill a Mockingbird was first published.
- Born: Jafar Panahi, Iranian filmmaker; in Mianeh
- Died: Sir George Hodges Knox, 74, Australian politician, orchardist and military officer

== July 12, 1960 (Tuesday) ==
- The Etch A Sketch was first manufactured. Licensed to Ohio Art Company by French inventor André Cassagnes, it quickly became one of the most popular toys of all time.
- Mercury astronauts began five and one-half days of "desert survival" training at the Air Training Command Survival School at Stead Air Force Base in Nevada, preparing them for the remote possibility of an arid-area landing.
- Louis Robichaud replaced Hugh John Flemming as premier of the Canadian province of New Brunswick. Robichaud would oversee dramatic reforms in the province's hospitals and schools.
- The Color Additives Amendments to the Federal Food, Drug, and Cosmetic Act went into effect, regulating artificial coloring of consumer goods sold in the United States.
- Orlyonok, the main Young Pioneer camp of the Russian SFSR, was founded.
- Born: Corynne Charby, French model, actress and singer; in Paris

== July 13, 1960 (Wednesday) ==
- Khieu Samphan, editor of the Phnom Penh newspaper L'Observatueur, was arrested and beaten by ten members of Cambodia's security police. As one author would note later, "There is no telling how many people later paid with their lives for this insult." Samphan would later help found the Communist Khmer Rouge and, 15 years later as the leader of the revolutionary government, would oversee a program of genocide in Cambodia.
- U.S. Senator John F. Kennedy won his party's nomination for president on the first ballot at the Democratic National Convention in Los Angeles, but not until Wyoming's 15 delegates gave him the 2/3 majority. With 761 votes needed, Kennedy got 806, while Lyndon Johnson received 409.
- The Pilkington Committee on Broadcasting was set up in the UK to review the state of broadcasting. After two years, the Pilkington Committee concluded that the British public did not want commercial broadcasting.
- Nobusuke Kishi, the Prime Minister of Japan, was stabbed six times in his left leg at his home, but the wounds were not life-threatening.
- Born: Ian Hislop, British journalist and broadcaster; in Mumbles, Swansea, Wales
- Died: Joy Davidman, 45, American poet and writer

== July 14, 1960 (Thursday) ==
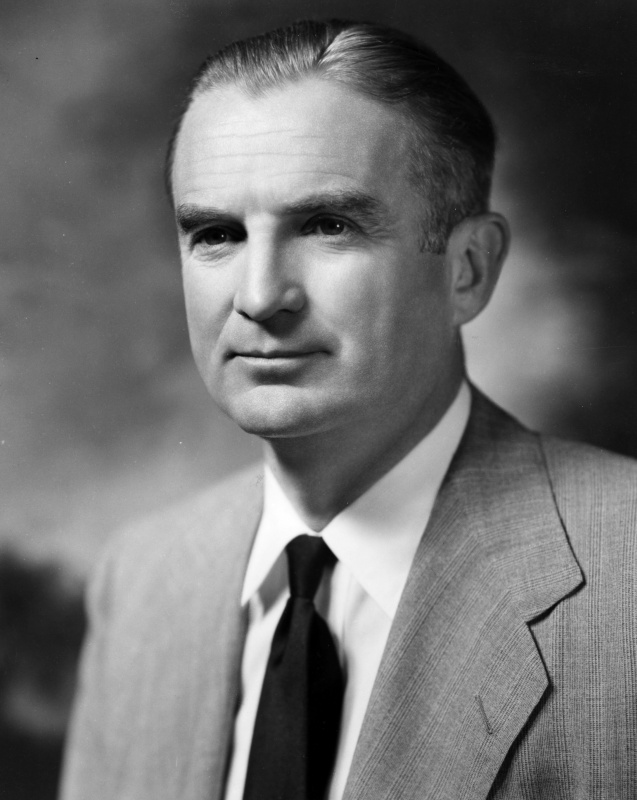
Stuart Symington

- In a choice that would determine the 36th President of the United States, Democratic presidential nominee and U.S. Senator John F. Kennedy asked U.S. Senate Majority Leader Lyndon Johnson to be his running mate at 9:00 a.m. in Los Angeles, and Johnson, to the surprise of many, accepted. The day before, U.S. Senator Stuart Symington of Missouri had been asked, and agreed, to become Kennedy's choice for the vice-presidency.
- By an 8–0 vote, the United Nations Security Council authorized the sending of U.N. forces to restore order in the Congo and in Katanga, and to request that Belgium withdraw its troops. The first U.N. forces arrived from Tunisia the next day.
- A fire at a mental hospital in Guatemala City killed 225 of the nearly 1,600 patients there.
- NASA announced that Project Mercury had 543 support personnel, with 419 assigned to the Space Task Group, and 124 from the Langley Research Center.
- Born:
  - Anna Bligh, Australian politician, Premier of Queensland from 2007 to 2012 and the first woman to be elected, rather than appointed, as the Premier of an Australian state; in Warwick, Queensland
  - Kyle Gass, American musician, actor and comedian; in Walnut Creek, California
  - Jane Lynch, American actress; in Evergreen Park, Illinois
- Died: Maurice de Broglie, 85, French physicist

== July 15, 1960 (Friday) ==
- Nobusuke Kishi resigned as Prime Minister of Japan, after conceding that the government was unable to control Leftist demonstrations. Three days later, the Diet confirmed Hayato Ikeda as the new Premier.
- Died: Lawrence Tibbett, 63, American opera singer

== July 16, 1960 (Saturday) ==
- The Soviet Union completed the Sino-Soviet split by notifying the government of the People's Republic of China that all 1,390 Soviet advisors and experts there would be withdrawn. Over the next month, the Soviets cancelled twelve economic and technological agreements, and 200 joint projects.
- The phrase "New Frontier", which would be used to describe the policies of John F. Kennedy, was first used in Kennedy's acceptance of the Democratic presidential nomination in Los Angeles. After referring to the American West ("what was once the 'last frontier'"), Kennedy said that "we stand today on the edge of a new frontier— the frontier of the 1960s".
- Died:
  - Field Marshal Albert Kesselring, 74, German Luftwaffe leader
  - John P. Marquand, 66, American author

== July 17, 1960 (Sunday) ==
- Joseph Kasavubu and Patrice Lumumba, unhappy with the United Nations' progress in pressuring Belgium to withdraw its troops from the former Belgian Congo, added a new dimension to the Congo Crisis by announcing that, if Belgian troops did not withdraw within 48 hours, the Congolese leaders would invite the Soviet Union to send troops to the African nation.
- Born: Robin Shou, Hong Kong actor and martial artist; in British Hong Kong
- Died: Pavol Peter Gojdič, 72, imprisoned Slovak bishop

== July 18, 1960 (Monday) ==
- In Chicago, the National League's owners voted unanimously to expand from eight teams to ten, and to meet with leaders of the American League and the new Continental League to plan the growth of Major League Baseball. The new NL teams, both in CL cities, would become the New York Mets and the Houston Colt .45s (later the Houston Astros).
- Born: William A. Dembski, American mathematician and proponent of "intelligent design"; in Chicago

== July 19, 1960 (Tuesday) ==
- At 8:30 p.m. EST, CBS aired the unsold pilot for "Head of the Family" on Comedy Spot. The pilot had Carl Reiner as TV writer Rob Petrie, Barbara Britton as Rob's wife Laura, Sylvia Miles as Sally Rogers and Morty Gunty as Buddy Sorrell. In 1961, CBS would score a hit with a new name and a new cast of Dick Van Dyke, Mary Tyler Moore, Rose Marie and Morey Amsterdam.
- Trans Australia Airlines Flight 408 was taken over by a gunman, Alex Hildebrandt of Russia, in the first airplane hijacking in Australia. The hijack was foiled when Hildebrandt was overpowered by the plane's first officer.
- An airplane crash killed 39 of the 43 Belgian Air Force servicemen on board during the Congo Crisis. The Fairchild C-119G "Flying Boxcar" struck a mountain near Goma
- Fernando Tambroni resigned as Prime Minister of Italy. A new government was approved on August 5, headed by former Premier Amintore Fanfani.
- Two U.S. Navy destroyers, the USS Ammen and the USS Collett, collided off the coast of Newport Beach, California, killing 10 sailors.
- An underground fire killed 39 iron miners near Salzgitter in West Germany.

== July 20, 1960 (Wednesday) ==
- Sirimavo Bandaranaike became the world's first elected female head of government, after her Sri Lanka Freedom Party won a majority in elections in Ceylon (now Sri Lanka). Mrs. Bandaranaike, whose husband S.W.D. Bandaranaike had been prime minister until his assassination in 1959, took office as Prime Minister of Ceylon the next day, and assumed the jobs of Defense Minister and External Affairs Minister as well.
- The first launch of a rocket from underwater into the air was made by the U.S. Navy submarine USS George Washington, with the firing of an unarmed Polaris missile while the sub was submerged at a depth of 30 feet (9.1 m).
- All 23 passengers and crew were killed on Aeroflot Flight 613 when their Ilyushin Il-14 airliner encountered turbulence and broke apart in midair during a flight from Leningrad to the smaller city of Syktyvkar. The passengers were all members of the 75th Squadron of the Soviet Civil Air Fleet; the plane was cleared to descend to an altitude of 300 metres (980 ft) and its crew acknowledged the directive. The wreckage was found on July 31, in a forest south of Lake Kenozero, about 87 kilometres (54 mi) from its destination.
- President Eisenhower announced that the United States had a budget surplus of $1.06 billion at the end of the 1960 fiscal year, a dramatic turnaround from the $12,426,000,000 deficit at the end of the 1959 fiscal year.
- Born: Prvoslav Vujcic, Serbian Canadian writer; in Požarevac, Yugoslavia

== July 21, 1960 (Thursday) ==
- The Parliament of Canada extended the right to vote in federal elections to the remaining First Nations indigenous citizens who had not previously received full suffrage, as an amendment to the Canada Elections Act passed its third reading in the Senate and was sent onward for assent. The people granted rights were the 60,000 "Status Indians" who lived on Canada's Indian reserves. The right had previously been extended to about 20,000 members of the First Nations, specifically veterans and their wives, members who did not live on a reserve, and to those living in the Northwest Territories and the Yukon. The Act would receive royal assent on August 1.
- The first television station in Egypt began broadcasting. After a verse from the Quran was read, United Arab Republic President Gamal Abdel Nasser was shown live, making a speech during celebrations of the eighth anniversary of the 1952 revolution.
- Francis Chichester, English navigator and yachtsman, arrived in New York aboard Gipsy Moth III to win the inaugural Single-Handed Trans-Atlantic Race, 40 days after setting sail across the Atlantic Ocean, setting a new record.

== July 22, 1960 (Friday) ==
- Jean Lesage replaced Antonio Barrette as Premier of Quebec, and began the Quiet Revolution reforms to that province.
- Vincent Massey became the first Canadian to receive the Royal Victorian Chain in its 58 years as an honour, as a recognition from Queen Elizabeth II.
- Born: John Leguizamo, Colombian-American actor, comedian and producer; in Bogotá

== July 23, 1960 (Saturday) ==
- The Soviet Union launched a space capsule with two dogs, Pchelka and Mushka, in advance of human spaceflight. Korabl 3 burned up upon re-entry into the atmosphere.
- Yusof bin Ishak, the Yang di-Pertuan Negara of Singapore, opened the headquarters of St. John Ambulance in Singapore.
- Mercury spacecraft No. 2 was delivered to Cape Canaveral for the Mercury-Redstone 1A mission.
- Born: Jon Landau, American film producer, known for producing Titanic, Avatar, and Avatar: The Way of Water; in New York City (died of cancer, 2024)

== July 24, 1960 (Sunday) ==
- An accident killed 30 Japanese tourists and injured 16 others who were on a chartered sightseeing bus, on their way back down from visiting the Buddhist shrine at Mount Hiei, after sideswiping another bus and plunging off of a mountain road into a ravine. Reportedly, the tourist bus "shot 60 yards straight down and then rolled over for another 100 yards before crashing." The persons on the other bus were uninjured.

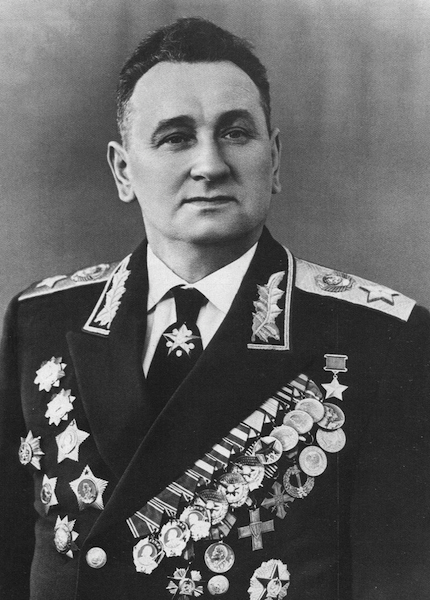
Marshal Grechko

- Soviet Marshal Ivan Konev retired as chief of the Warsaw Pact, and was replaced by another Soviet military man, Marshal Andrei Grechko. Marshal Grechko would become the Soviet Minister of Defense in 1967, and would be replaced as Warsaw Pact commander by Marshal Ivan Yakubovsky on July 8, 1967.
- Died:
  - Jacques Jaccard, 73, American silent film director in the 1910s and 1920s
  - Hans Albers, 68, leading man of German film in the 1930s and early 1940s

== July 25, 1960 (Monday) ==
- The lunch counter at the Woolworth's store in Greensboro, North Carolina, where the "Greensboro Four" had started the first sit-in in January, began service to African-American customers (actually, three store employees) at 2:30 p.m. Integration of Greensboro's other restaurants did not happen until 1963.

== July 26, 1960 (Tuesday) ==
- Fifteen months after U.S. President Eisenhower had proposed that the Soviet Union and the United States be allowed to inspect their opponents' missile sites, the Soviets made a counteroffer "to allow international inspection teams to carry out three on-site inspections annually on its territory." The U.S. and its allies considered the number to be inadequate, but saw it as the basis for negotiations. Actual inspections would not take place until more than 25 years later.
- The opening title sequence of The Andy Griffith Show, showing Andy Griffith and Ron Howard preparing to go fishing, was filmed in advance of the show's October 3 premiere. The Franklin Canyon Reservoir in Los Angeles served as Myers Lake (named for the show's production manager, Frank E. Myers) on the outskirts of Mayberry, North Carolina, for purposes of the show.
- Died:
  - Cedric Gibbons, 67, pioneering Irish-American film art director
  - Maud Menten, 81, Canadian biochemist

== July 27, 1960 (Wednesday) ==
- The Republic of Ireland ended its policy of neutrality with the dispatch of soldiers of the 32nd Infantry Battalion to Africa to join United Nations peacekeeping forces during the Congo Crisis. The Defence Amendment Act 1960 had taken effect the day before after passing both houses of the Irish parliament.
- In Chicago, delegates to the Republican National Convention nominated U.S. Vice President Richard M. Nixon for president, with 1,321 votes. Ten delegates voted for Barry Goldwater. U.S. Ambassador to the United Nations Henry Cabot Lodge Jr. was nominated for Vice President.
- The Federal Reserve Board voted to cut margin requirements from 90% to 70%, in order to encourage buying and selling in the American stock market.

== July 28, 1960 (Thursday) ==
- The Soviet Union launched the first of six Vostok 1K animal flight missions, with two space dogs, Chayka and Lisichka. An explosion destroyed the spacecraft shortly after launch, killing both dogs, and the mission was not publicized, nor given a name afterward.

== July 29, 1960 (Friday) ==
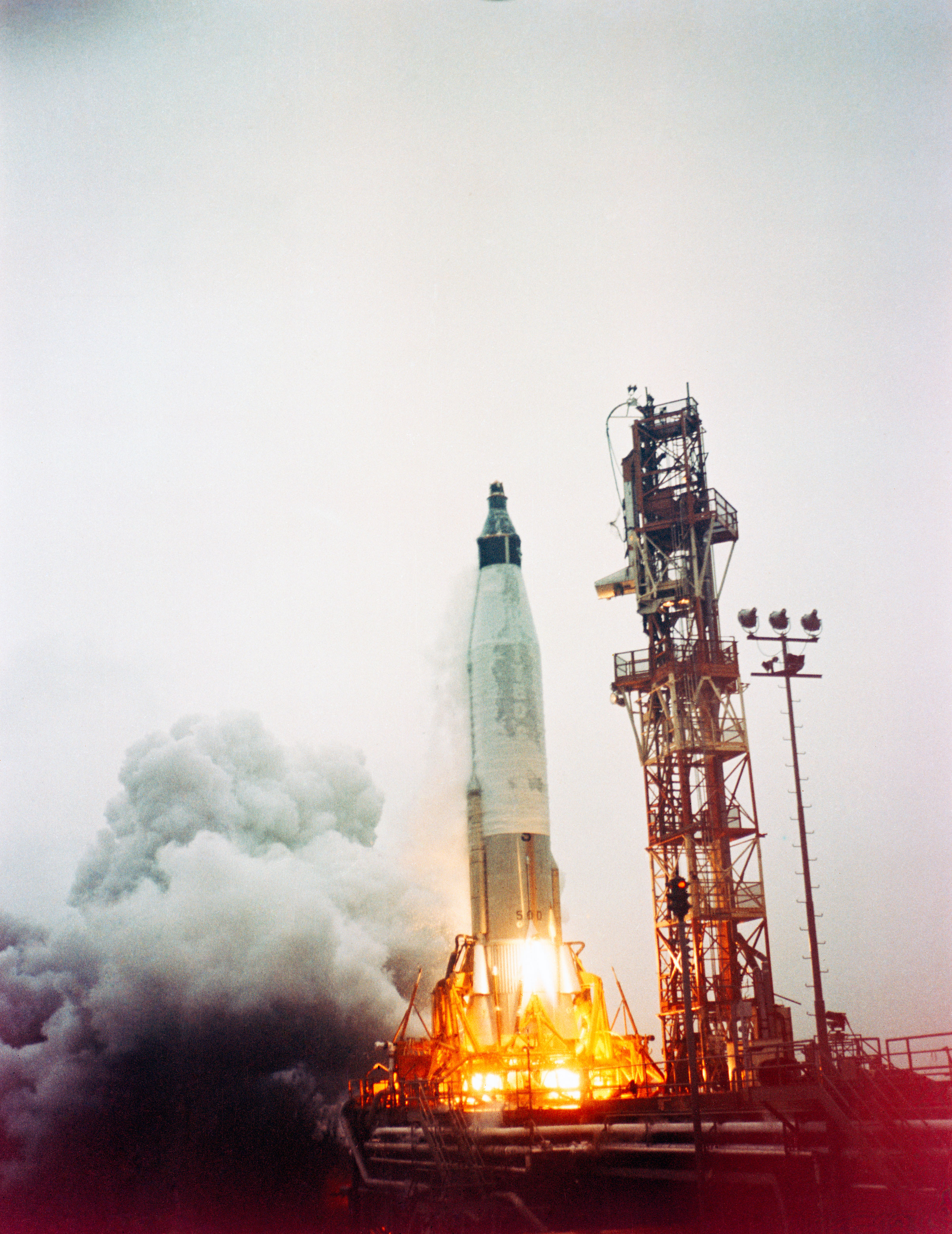
July 29, 1960: Launch of Mercury-Atlas 1

- Mercury-Atlas 1 was launched from Cape Canaveral on a sub-orbital flight, to check the integrity of the Mercury spacecraft structure and afterbody shingles for critical abort reentry, and to evaluate the Atlas abort-sensing instrumentation system. The spacecraft had no escape system or test subject. After 59 seconds, the flight was terminated because of a launch vehicle and adapter structural failure, and the spacecraft was destroyed on impact in the ocean. Since none of the primary flight objectives was achieved, Mercury-Atlas 2 was planned to fulfill the mission.
- 10 Downing Street, the official London residence of the British Prime Minister, was closed for renovations expected to last at least two years. Harold Macmillan's home was transferred for the interim to Admiralty House.
- The U.S. Federal Communications Commission voted 6–1 against censorship of American radio and television communications, following hearings in which various witnesses testified in favor of FCC intervention.
- In new elections in South Korea, the Democrat party, led by Chang Myon (also known as John M. Chang and Tsutomu Tamaoka), won a majority. Chang became Prime Minister of South Korea on August 19.
- Born:
  - Brian Peck, American convicted sex offender and former actor; in Huntington, Indiana
  - Marta Cid, Catalan Education Minister; in Amposta, Spain

== July 30, 1960 (Saturday) ==
- The American Football League played its first game, an exhibition between the Buffalo Bills and the Boston Patriots, before a crowd of 16,474 in Buffalo, and the home team lost, 28 to 7. Bob Dee of the Patriots recovered a fumble in the end zone for the first unofficial AFL score.
- South Korea and North Korea fought a battle as at sea for the first time since the end of the Korean War in 1953, with a North Korean gunboat being sunk near Kojin.

== July 31, 1960 (Sunday) ==
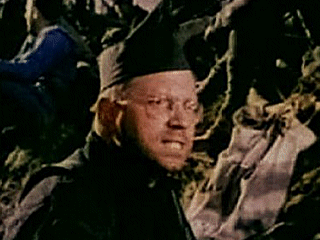
Freed (1952 photo), TV's first Lt. Colombo

- Lieutenant Columbo, the fictional TV detective who would be more famously portrayed by actor Peter Falk, was introduced in a 90-minute episode of the anthology series The Chevy Mystery Show, shown at 9:00 Eastern time on NBC. Bert Freed was the first to portray Lieutenant Columbo, described as "a police detective harassing the doctor", though actor Richard Carlson (who portrayed a psychiatrist who murdered his wife) received top billing in the teleplay, titled "Enough Rope".
- The Malayan Emergency was officially ended after twelve years. On June 16, 1948, the state of emergency was declared in the Federation of Malaya after guerrilla activity had begun. The date had been announced on April 19 by the Malayan head of state, Sultan Hisamuddin Alam Shah.
