= 1960 political clashes in the Iraqi Cigarette Workers Union =

1960 saw a protracted political conflict between communists and anti-communists for control over the leadership of the Iraqi Cigarette Industry Workers Trade Union (Arabic: نقابة عمال ومستخدمي صناعة السجائر). The conflict within the Cigarette Workers Union marked the culmination of tensions between the Iraqi Communist Party and its opponents within the trade union movement at the time.

An election to the union executive committee was held on June 17, 1960. The list launched by the communists won the election. However, government authorities intervened and annulled the election, citing 'corruption'. The government authorities called for new elections on October 28, 1960, in which the pro-communist list was defeated. The communists cried foul, claiming that these elections had been rigged. They charged that the military authorities were committing electoral fraud to remove the militant union chairman Muhammad Ghabban from his post in the union leadership.

On October 30, 1960, they called for strikes at the ar-Rafidain and al-Ahalia factories. In response, the Military Governor-General annulled the election on the same day. The strike was called off and workers returned to their work places.

The anti-communist group, which had claimed victory in the October 28 election, petitioned Abd al-Karim Qasim. They stated that the result of the October 28 election should be recognized as valid.

On November 3, 1960, the Military Governor-General postponed the union elections indefinitely. In response, a strike at the two factories was launched on November 5, 1960. Violent clashes between workers and police took place during the strike. A number of workers were killed or injured in the clashes. In Baghdad troops were used against striking workers, and eight people were killed and 26 were injured (including four women) in firing on demonstrators. By November 14, 1960, the strike was called off. During the protest movement over one hundred workers were arrested.

On November 28, 1960, elections were held once again, in which the anti-communist list obtained 1,186 votes and the pro-communist list 208 votes.

Subsequently, the affair was brought to the attention of the International Labour Organization.
