= Janos Galambos =

Hungarian-American mathematician (1940–2019)

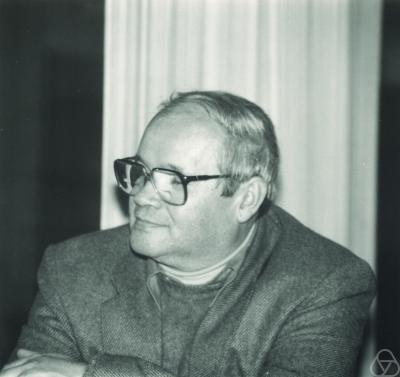
- Janos Galambos in 1987.
- Born: September 1, 1940; Zirc, Hungary
- Died: December 19, 2019 (aged 79); Willow Grove, Pennsylvania, US
- Education: Eötvös Loránd University
- Scientific career
- Institutions: Eötvös Loránd University; University of Ghana; University of Ibadan; Temple University
- Doctoral advisor: Alfréd Rényi

Janos Galambos (Hungarian: Galambos János; 1 September 1940 – 19 December 2019) was a Hungarian mathematician affiliated with Temple University in Philadelphia, Pennsylvania, United States.

== Education and career ==
Galambos earned his Ph.D. in 1963 from Eötvös Loránd University, under the supervision of Alfréd Rényi. He remained at the Eötvös Loránd University as an assistant professor from 1964 to 1965. He was lecturer at the University of Ghana from 1965 to 1969 and at University of Ibadan from 1969 to 1970. In 1970, Galambos joined the faculty of Temple University in Philadelphia and remained there until his retirement in 2012.

Galambos worked on probability theory, number theory, order statistics, and many other sub-specialties, and published hundreds of papers and many books.

In 1993 he was elected external member of the Hungarian Academy of Sciences, and in 2001 he became a corresponding member of the Royal Academy of Engineering of Spain.

== Selected books ==
- Galambos, János (1976). Representations of real numbers by infinite series. Berlin: Springer-Verlag. ISBN 0-387-07547-X. OCLC 2111173.
- Galambos, János (1978). The asymptotic theory of extreme order statistics. New York: Wiley. ISBN 0-471-02148-2. OCLC 3669424.
- Galambos, János; Kotz, Samuel (1978). Characterizations of probability distributions : a unified approach with an emphasis on exponential and related models. Berlin: Springer-Verlag. ISBN 0-387-08933-0. OCLC 4194743.
- Galambos, János (1984). Introductory probability theory. New York: M. Dekker. ISBN 0-8247-7179-6. OCLC 11133172.
- Galambos, János (1995). Advanced probability theory, second edition. New York: CRC Press. ISBN 0-367-40163-0. OCLC 1111944670.
- Galambos, János; Simonelli, Italo (1996). Bonferroni-type inequalities with applications. New York: Springer. ISBN 0-387-94776-0. OCLC 34548778.
- Galambos, János; Simonelli, Italo (2004). Products of random variables : applications to problems of physics and to arithmetical functions. New York: Marcel Dekker. ISBN 0-8247-5402-6. OCLC 56338637.
