= Typhoon Wendy (1960) =

Pacific typhoon in 1960

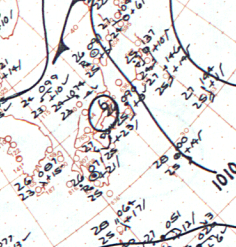
- Surface analysis of Typhoon Wendy near Japan

Meteorological history
- Formed: August 10, 1960
- Extratropical: August 13, 1960
- Dissipated: August 15, 1960

Unknown-strength storm
- 10-minute sustained (JMA)
- Lowest pressure: 990 hPa (mbar); 29.23 inHg

Category 1-equivalent typhoon
- 1-minute sustained (SSHWS/JTWC)
- Highest winds: 140 km/h (85 mph)
- Lowest pressure: 986 hPa (mbar); 29.12 inHg

Overall effects
- Fatalities: 28 confirmed
- Missing: 19
- Areas affected: Japan
- IBTrACS
- Part of the 1960 Pacific typhoon season

Typhoon Wendy was a weak typhoon that damaged Japan in August of the 1960 Pacific typhoon season. On August 10, a tropical depression formed near Typhoon Virginia and strengthened to a tropical storm later that day, receiving the name Wendy from the Joint Typhoon Warning Center (JTWC). The storm continued to intensify as it traveled toward the Japanese archipelago, becoming a typhoon a day after formation. The typhoon peaked with winds of 140 kilometres per hour (85 mph) while located south of Japan. Wendy made landfalls in Shikoku and Honshu on August 12, and became extratropical on August 13. The Japan Meteorological Agency (JMA) stopped tracking the cyclone on August 15.

Wendy caused a large amount of damage in central Japan. The storm flooded thousands of homes and damaged significant tracts of land. Some rivers overflowed and hundreds of bridges were destroyed. Overall, 28 people were killed, and 19 were missing.

== Meteorological history ==
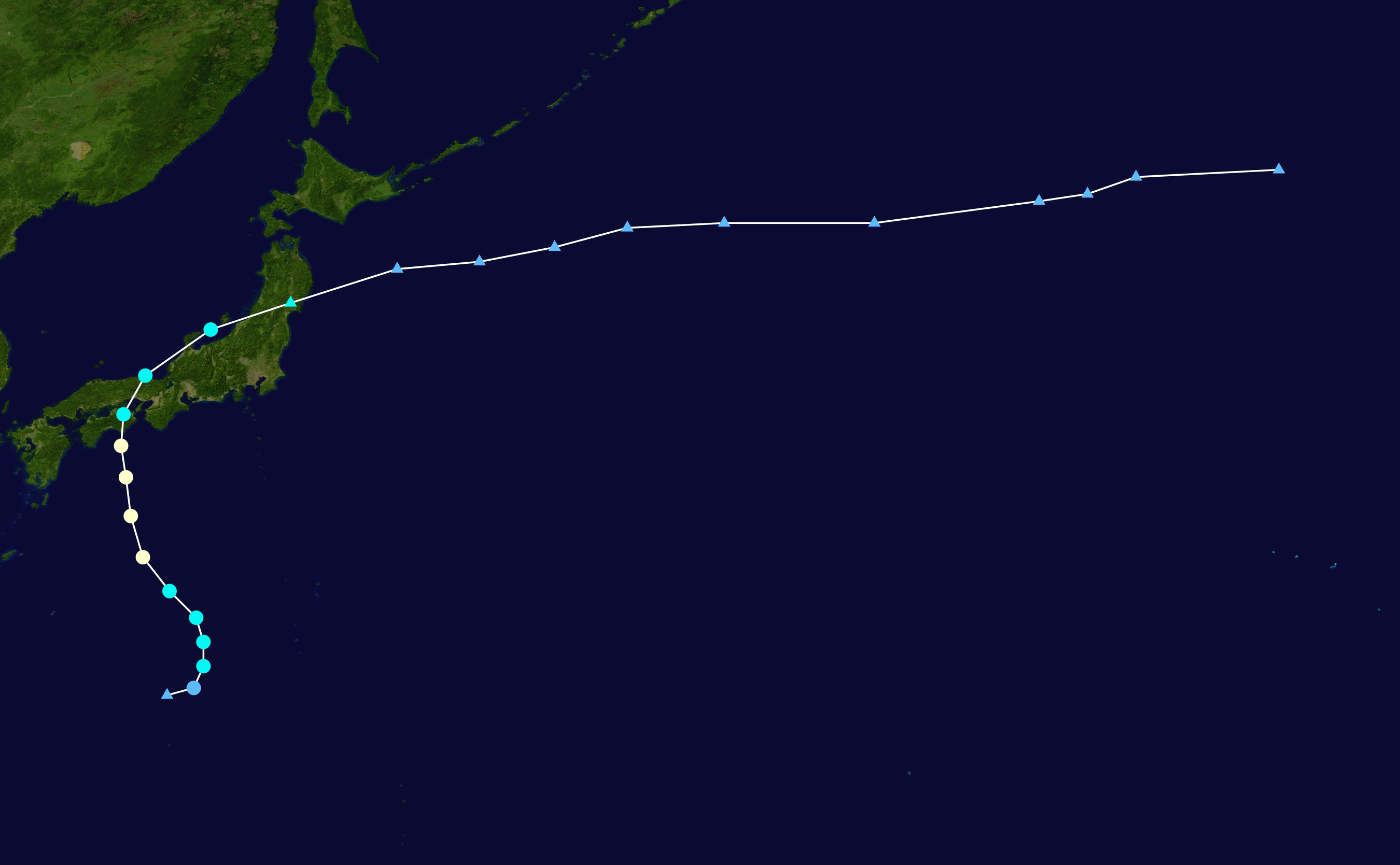
Map plotting the storm's track and intensity, according to the Saffir–Simpson scale Map key Saffir–Simpson scale Tropical depression (≤38 mph, ≤62 km/h) Tropical storm (39–73 mph, 63–118 km/h) Category 1 (74–95 mph, 119–153 km/h) Category 2 (96–110 mph, 154–177 km/h) Category 3 (111–129 mph, 178–208 km/h) Category 4 (130–156 mph, 209–251 km/h) Category 5 (≥157 mph, ≥252 km/h) Unknown Storm type Tropical cyclone Subtropical cyclone Extratropical cyclone, remnant low, tropical disturbance, or monsoon depression

On August 10, a trough extended southward from Typhoon Virginia, and was detected by the Joint Typhoon Warning Center (JTWC) as having abnormal wind directions compared to Virginia's circulation. The Japanese Meteorological Agency (JMA) designated the system as a tropical depression also at that time, with the pressure reading at 1,000 hectopascals (30 inHg). (Note: The Japan Meteorological Agency is the official Regional Specialized Meteorological Center for the western Pacific Ocean.) At 12:00 UTC, the JTWC assessed the system had reached tropical storm strength 330 kilometres (205 mi) west of Iwo Jima, with winds of 75 km/h (45 mph). The storm was not given the name Wendy until six hours later, when it was operationally upgraded to a tropical storm. The JMA also upgraded Wendy to a tropical storm at 12:00 UTC.

Wendy strengthened to 100 km/h (60 mph), with a pressure of 996 hPa (29.4 inHg) by August 11 at 00:00 UTC. Operationally, the JTWC upgraded Wendy to a typhoon at 06:00 UTC south of Shikoku, with a reconnaissance flight reporting winds of 120 km/h (75 mph), but it was revised to 12:00 UTC after analysis. According to the JTWC, Wendy reached peak strength offshore Shikoku, with winds of 140 km/h (85 mph) on August 12 at 00:00 UTC, but the lowest pressure, 990 hPa (29 inHg), was recorded six hours later by the JMA.

The typhoon officially made landfall on Shikoku at 08:00 UTC, 39 hours after Virginia made landfall 32 km (20 mi) west of the landfall location. Wendy soon made another landfall over southern Honshu later that day, remaining on land for ten hours, and weakening to 75 km/h (45 mph). After reemerging over the Sea of Japan at 18:00 UTC, the winds strengthened slightly to 80 km/h (50 mph), and pressure went up to 1,002 hPa (29.6 inHg). The storm sped up and made its final landfall over northern Honshu on August 13 at 03:00 UTC, with winds of 80 km/h (50 mph) and pressure of 1,004 hPa (29.6 inHg). At 06:00 UTC, the JTWC issued its last advisory on Wendy, as it was no longer a hazard. The JMA declared the storm extratropical at the same time, and the agency continued to track the cyclone until it reached near the International Date Line at 18:00 UTC on August 15.

The development of the storm was considered unusual by the JTWC and the United States Weather Bureau (USWB). During most of its duration, Wendy did not sustain a circulation at 200–300 hPa (5.9–8.9 inHg) levels, and formed over an area of upper level convergence. Wendy also developed within the circulation of Virginia, which lead the JTWC to possibly consider Wendy as Virginia's "offspring".

== Impact ==
Wendy caused damage to the Kinki and Chūbu regions of Japan from August 12 to 13. The typhoon dropped around 380–510 millimetres (15–20 in) of rain and winds of 108 km/h (67 mph) were recorded on Shikoku. The floods caused the Nagara River to overflow its banks at four locations, and it also destroyed more than 260 bridges. The floods inundated 21,144 houses and destroyed 449 of them. It also damaged 7,764 hectares (19,190 acres) of land, and more than 450 landslides were reported. In small villages across the Shizuoka and Gifu prefectures, 1,000 people were rescued by Japan Air Self-Defense Force helicopters. During the storm, 1,500 climbers were stranded in the Northern Alps, with no injuries and low supplies. The total count was 28 people killed, 19 missing, and 154 injuries. Three of those casualties were construction workers who were struck by lightning on a construction site in the Aichi Prefecture.

== See also ==
- Typhoon Ida (1958)
- Typhoon Vera
- Typhoon Nancy (1961)
