= Carlo Emilio Bonferroni =

Italian mathematician (1892–1960)

Carlo E. Bonferroni
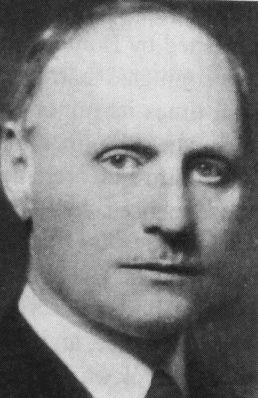
- Carlo Emilio Bonferroni
- Born: 28 January 1892; Bergamo, Italy
- Died: 18 August 1960 (aged 68); Florence, Italy
- Education: University of Turin
- Spouse: Jolenda Bonferroni
- Scientific career
- Fields: Mathematics; Statistics
- Workplaces: Polytechnic University of Turin; University of Bari; University of Florence
- Academic advisors: Giuseppe Peano; Corrado Segre

Carlo Emilio Bonferroni (28 January 1892 – 18 August 1960) was an Italian mathematician who worked on probability theory. Bonferroni is best known for the Bonferroni inequalities (a generalization of the union bound), and for the Bonferroni correction in statistics, which he did not invent, but which is related to the Bonferroni inequalities.

== Biography ==
Bonferroni studied piano and conducting in Turin Conservatory and a studied mathematics at University of Turin under Giuseppe Peano and Corrado Segre, where he obtained his laurea. During this time he also studied at University of Vienna and ETH Zurich. During World War I, he was an officer among the engineers. Bonferroni held a position as assistant professor at the Polytechnic University of Turin, and in 1923 took up the chair of financial mathematics at the Economics Institute of the University of Bari. In 1933 he transferred to University of Florence, where he held his chair until his death.

He first discussed the concept of Bonferroni inequalities in his 1935 paper "Il calcolo delle assicurazioni su gruppi di teste".

== See also ==
- Bonferroni inequalities
- Bonferroni correction
