= Quantum metrological gain =

Measurement in quantum metrology

The quantum metrological gain is defined in the context of carrying out a metrological task using a quantum state of a multiparticle system. It is the improvement in measurement precision achieved by utilizing quantum resources (such as entanglement or state squeezing) compared to the best possible classical methods using separable states, i.e., states without quantum entanglement. If the metrological gain is larger than one then the quantum state is more useful for making precise measurements than separable states. Clearly, in this case the quantum state is also entangled.

== Background ==
Let us consider unitary dynamics with a parameter $\theta$ from initial state $\varrho_0$,

$$\varrho(\theta)=\exp(-iA\theta)\varrho_0\exp(+iA\theta),$$

the quantum Fisher information $F_{\rm Q}$ constrains the achievable precision in statistical estimation of the parameter $\theta$ via the quantum Cramér–Rao bound as

$$(\Delta \theta)^2 \ge \frac 1 {m F_{\rm Q}[\varrho,A]},$$

where $m$ is the number of independent repetitions. For the formula, one can see that the larger the quantum Fisher information, the smaller can be the uncertainty of the parameter estimation.

For a multiparticle system of $N$ spin-1/2 particles

$$F_{\rm Q}[\varrho, J_z] \le N$$

holds for separable states, where $F_{\rm Q}$ is the quantum Fisher information,

$$J_z=\sum_{n=1}^N j_z^{(n)},$$

and $j_z^{(n)}$ is a single particle angular momentum component. Thus, the metrological gain can be characterized by

$$\frac{F_{\rm Q}[\varrho, J_z]}{N}.$$

The maximum for general quantum states is given by

$$F_{\rm Q}[\varrho, J_z] \le N^2.$$

Hence, quantum entanglement is needed to reach the maximum precision in quantum metrology. Moreover, for quantum states with an entanglement depth $k$,

$$F_{\rm Q}[\varrho, J_z] \le sk^2 + r^{2}$$

holds, where $s=\lfloor N/k \rfloor$ is the largest integer smaller than or equal to $N/k,$ and $r=N-sk$ is the remainder from dividing $N$ by $k$. Hence, higher and higher levels of multipartite entanglement are needed to achieve better and better accuracy in parameter estimation. It is possible to obtain a weaker but simpler bound

$$F_{\rm Q}[\varrho, J_z] \le Nk.$$

Hence, a lower bound on the entanglement depth is obtained as

$$\frac{F_{\rm Q}[\varrho, J_z]}{N} \le k.$$

These ideas have been used to measure the metrological gain in many physical systems such as cold atoms and photons. Metrological gains up to 100 are reported in experiments with cold atomic ensembles.

One can consider more general Hamiltonians of $N$ spin-1/2 particles defined as

$$H=\sum_{n=1}^N u^{(n)} j_z^{(n)} (u^{(n)})^{\dagger},$$

where $u^{(n)}$ is a local unitary acting on the nth spin. For all such Hamiltonians the bound for separable states remain $N$, and all the other bounds remain the same. An optimization over such Hamiltonians has been carried out showing that certain cluster states (e.g., ring cluster states for $N\ge 5$) are not more useful metrologically than separable states.

== Mathematical definition for a system of qudits ==
The situation for qudits with a dimension larger than $d=2$ is more complicated. In this more general case, the metrological gain for a given Hamiltonian is defined as the ratio of the quantum Fisher information of a state and the maximum of the quantum Fisher information for the same Hamiltonian for separable states

$$g_{\mathcal H}(\varrho)=\frac{\mathcal F_Q[\varrho,{\mathcal H}]}{\mathcal F_Q^{({\rm sep})}(\mathcal H)},$$

where the Hamiltonian is

$$\mathcal H=h_1+h_2+...+h_N,$$

and $h_n$ acts on the nth spin. The maximum of the quantum Fisher information for separable states is given as

$$\mathcal F_Q^{({\rm sep})}(\mathcal H)=\sum_{n=1}^N [ \lambda_{\max}(h_n)-\lambda_{\min}(h_n) ]^2,$$

where $\lambda_{\max}(X)$ and $\lambda_{\min}(X)$ denote the maximum and minimum eigenvalues of $X,$ respectively.

We also define the metrological gain optimized over all local Hamiltonians as

$$g(\varrho)=\max_{\mathcal H}g_{\mathcal H}(\varrho).$$

The case of qubits is special. In this case, if the local Hamiltonians are chosen to be

$$h_n=\sum_{l=x,y,z} c_{l,n}\sigma_l,$$

where $c_{l,n}$ are real numbers, and $|\vec c_n|=1,$ then

$$\mathcal F_Q^{({\rm sep})}(\mathcal H)=4N$$,

independently from the concrete values of $c_{l,n}$. Thus, in the case of qubits, the optimization of the gain over the local Hamiltonian can be simpler. For qudits with a dimension larger than 2, the optimization is more complicated.

== Relation to quantum entanglement ==
The quantum metrological gain is directly connected to multiparticle entanglement in many-particle systems.

If the gain is larger than one

$$g(\varrho)>1,$$

then the state is entangled, and it is more useful metrologically than separable states. In short, we call such states metrologically useful. If $h_n$ all have identical lowest and highest eigenvalues, then

$$g(\varrho)>k-1$$

implies metrologically useful $k$-partite entanglement. If for the gain

$$g(\varrho)>N-1$$

holds, then the state has metrologically useful genuine multipartite entanglement. In general, for quantum states $g(\varrho)\le N$ holds.

== Properties of the metrological gain ==
The metrological gain cannot decrease if we add an ancilla to a subsystem or we provide an additional copy of the state. Thus,

$$g(\varrho_{AB}\otimes\varrho_{a}) \ge  g(\varrho_{AB})$$

holds, where $A$ and $a$ belong to the same party. Moreover,

$$g(\varrho_{AB} \otimes \varrho_{A'B'}) \ge g(\varrho_{AB})$$

also holds, where $A$ and $A'$ belong to the same party, and $B$ and $B'$ also belong to the same party.

It has been proven that for quantum states $\varrho_1$ and $\varrho_2$, and for $0\le p\le1$

$$g(p\varrho_1+(1-p)\varrho_2)\le p_1 g(\varrho_1)+ p_2 g(\varrho_2)$$

holds, thus the metrological gain is convex in the quantum state.

== Numerical determination of the gain ==
The optimization of the metrological gain over local Hamiltonians is a hard task, since it is defined as a fraction of two quantities that both depend on the Hamiltonian. Moreover, in the denominator, the quantum Fisher information is a convex function of the Hamiltonian. Maximizing a convex function over a convex set is a difficult task.

There are still efficient methods to determine the metrological gain based on an optimization over local Hamiltonians. They are based on see-saw methods that iterate two steps alternatively. A possible see-saw method can be obtain from the following formula

$$\max_{H} F_Q[\varrho,H] = \max_{H,M} \frac{|\langle i[H,M]\rangle_\varrho|^2}{(\Delta M)^2_\varrho}.$$

In the right-hand side, there is the error-propagation formula. Here, instead of a direct optimization over local Hamiltonians $H,$ we can alternatingly optimize of over $H$ and $M.$ For the optimization, we use the constraints

$$\lambda_{\max}(h_n)=c_n,\qquad \lambda_{\min}(h_n)=-c_n,$$

where $c_n\ge0$ are constants.

An alternative is optimizing the Fisher matrix element using

$$\max_{H} F_Q[\varrho,H] = \max_{H_1,H_2} F_Q[\varrho,H_1 H_2] .$$

Here, instead of a direct optimization over local Hamiltonians $H,$ we can alternatingly optimize of over $H_1$ and $H_2.$ The Fisher matrix element is given as

$$F_{\rm Q}[\varrho,H_1,H_2]=2\sum_{k,l} \frac{(\lambda_k-\lambda_l)^2}{(\lambda_k+\lambda_l)} \langle k \vert H_1 \vert l\rangle \langle l \vert H_2 \vert k\rangle.$$

Clearly, we have

$$F_{\rm Q}[\varrho,H,H]=F_{\rm Q}[\varrho,H].$$
