= Dicke state =

Quantum state

In quantum optics and quantum information, a Dicke state is a quantum state defined by Robert H. Dicke in connection to spontaneous radiation processes taking place in an ensemble of two-state atoms. A Dicke state is the simultaneous eigenstate of the angular momentum operators ${\vec J}^2$ and $J_z.$ Dicke states have recently been realized with photons with up to six particles and cold atoms of more than thousands of particles. They are highly entangled, and in quantum metrology they lead to the maximal Heisenberg scaling of the precision of parameter estimation.

== Definition ==
Dicke states are defined in a system of $N$ spin-$s$ particles as the simultaneous eigenstates of the angular momentum operators ${\vec J}^2$ and $J_z$ by the equations

$${\vec J}^2|j,j_z,\alpha\rangle = j(j+1)|j,j_z,\alpha\rangle$$

and

$$J_z |j,j_z,\alpha\rangle = j_z|j,j_z,\alpha\rangle.$$

Here, $\alpha$ is a label used to distinguish several states orthogonal to each other, for which the two eigenvalues are the same.

It is instructive to consider the $s=1/2$ case, namely an $N$-qubit system. For $j=N/2$, Dicke states are symmetric. In this case, we do not need the additional parameter $\alpha$, since for a given $j_z,$ there is only a single simultaneous eigenstate of ${\vec J}^2$ and $J_z$.

It is also common to use for the characterization of these states the quantity $m=N/2-j_z$. They can be written as

$$|D_N^{(m)}\rangle =  \binom{N}{m}^{-1/2}\sum_{k} {\mathcal{P}}_{k}(|0\rangle^{\otimes(N-m)} \otimes |1\rangle^{\otimes m}),$$

where $m=0,1,...,N$ is the number of 1's, and the summation is over all distinct permutations.

A W-state is given as

$$|W\rangle =  \frac1{\sqrt{N}}(|1000...000\rangle+|0100...000\rangle+|0010...000\rangle+...
+|0000...001\rangle)$$

and it equals the Dicke state $|D_N^{(1)}\rangle$.

The entanglement properties of symmetric Dicke states have been studied extensively.

Symmetric Dicke states of $N$ spin-$s$ particles can easily be mapped to symmetric Dicke states of $2sN$ spin-1/2 particles.

The case of $j<N/2,$ i.e., the case of non-symmetric Dicke states in multi-qubit systems is more complicated. In this case, the simultaneous eigenstates are denoted by $|j,j_z,\alpha\rangle$, and we need now the $\alpha$ label to dinstinguish several eigenstates with the same eigenvalues orthogonal to each other. These states can also be obtained explicitly.

== Fidelity ==
In an experiment, determining the fidelity with respect to pure quantum states is not an easy task in general. However, for states in the symmetric (bosonic) subspace, the necessary measurement effort increases only polynomially with the number of particles. For instance, for $N$ qubits it is bounded from above by $N^2/2+3N/2+1$ local measurement settings, which is known from the theory of permutationally invariant quantum state tomography. It is also a valid bound for measuring the fidelity with respect to symmetric Dicke states.

For the 4-qubit case, 7 local measurement settings is sufficient, while for the 6-qubit case 21 local measuement settings is sufficient.

== Entanglement properties ==
When a Dicke state has been prepared in an experiment, it is important to verify that the state has been prepared with a good quality. Apart from obtaining the fidelity, a usual goal is to show that the quantum state was highly entangled.

If for a quantum state $\varrho$ the fidelity with respect to W-states

$${\rm Tr}(\varrho|W\rangle\langle W|)> 1-1/N$$

holds then the quantum state is genuine multipartite entangled. This means that all the particles are entangled with each other, and the quantum state cannot be put together with entangled quantum states of smaller units by trivial operations such as making a tensor product and mixing.

Note that the bound is approaching 1 for a large $N$, which can make experiments with large systems difficult.

For the symmetric Dicke state $|D_{N}^{(N/2)}\rangle$, if for the fidelity of a quantum state

$${\rm Tr}(\varrho|D_{N}^{(N/2)}\rangle\langle D_{N}^{(N/2)}|)> \frac{1}{2} \frac{N}{N-1}$$

holds then the quantum state is genuine multipartite entangled. Now the bound approaches 1/2 for large $N$, which makes experiments for detecting genuine multipartite entanglement feasible even for a large $N$.

Unlike in the case of GHZ states, the entanglement of Dicke states can be detected by measuring collective observables. It is also possible to detect multipartite entanglement or entanglement depth of such states based on collective measurements. Finally, there are efficient methods to detect multipartite entanglement of noisey Dicke states based on their density matrix.

== Metrological properties for magnetometry ==
For an $N$-qubit quantum state,

$$F_Q[\varrho,J_l]\le N^2$$

holds for $l=x,y,z,$ where $J_l$ are the components of the collective angular momentum

$$J_l=\frac 1 2 \sum_{n=1}^N \sigma_l^{(n)},$$

and $\sigma_l$ are the Pauli spin matrices.

Here, $F_Q[\varrho,H]$ denotes the quantum Fisher information characterizing how well the state $\varrho$ can be used to estimate the parameter $\theta$ in the unitary dynamics

$$U=\exp(-iH\theta).$$

For separable states the bound discovered by Pezzé and Smerzi

$$F_Q[\varrho,J_l]\le N$$

holds, which is relevant for linear interferometers, a very large class of interferometers used in experiments. For the Dicke state $|D_{N}^{(N/2)}\rangle$

$$F_Q[\varrho,J_x]=F_Q[\varrho,J_y]=N(N+2)/2$$

holds, which corresponds to a quadratic scaling in the particle number, that is, a Heisenberg scaling.

Such Dicke states also saturate the relation

$$F_Q[\varrho,J_x]+F_Q[\varrho,J_y]+F_Q[\varrho,J_z]\le N(N+2),$$

which is valid for any quantum state. Greenberger–Horne–Zeilinger (GHZ) states also saturate this relation.

== Differential magnetometry with two ensembles ==
One can also consider differential magnetometry with $N_a$ spin-1/2 particles in one ensemble, and $N_b$ spin-1/2 particles in the other ensemble, which case is characterized by the bound

$$\sum_{l=x,y,z} F_Q[\varrho,J_{l,a}-J_{l,b}]\le N(N+2) + 4 \min(N_a,N_b).$$

Note that the right-hand side is larger than $N(N+2)$. We define the partially flipped Dicke state as

$$|\widetilde{D}_{N}^{(N/2)}\rangle={\rm Identity}^{\otimes N_a} \otimes \sigma_z^{\otimes N_b} |D_{N}^{(N/2)}\rangle$$

For the partially flipped Dicke state the left-hand side is

$$\sum_{l= x,y,z} F_Q[\varrho, J_{l,a}{-}J_{l,b}] = N(N+2)+\frac{4N_a N_b}{N-1}.$$

If $N_a=N_b=N/2$ then the value is $N(N+3)$ for large $N.$ We also have $F_Q[\varrho, J_{x,a}{-}J_{x,b}]=F_Q[\varrho, J_{y,a}{-}J_{y,b}]\sim N^2/2 +3/2$ corresponding to the Heisenberg scaling.

== Experiments ==
W-states of three qubits have been created in photons.

Symmetric Dicke states $|D_{N}^{(N/2)}\rangle$ have been created in a four and a six-qubit photonic experiment in which genuine four- and six-particle entanglement, respectively, has been demonstrated.

They have also been prepared in a Bose-Einstein condensate with thousands of atoms.

Dicke states have also been used for quantum metrology in cold gases and photonic systems. In these experiments it has been demonstrated that the experimentally created Dicke states outperform separable states in metrology.

Multipartite entanglement and the depth of entanglement has been detected in Dicke states in an ensemble of cold atoms.

Bipartite entanglement and Einstein–Podolsky–Rosen (EPR) steering has been detected in Dicke states of an ensemble of thousands of cold atoms.

== See also ==
- Bell state
- Graph state
- Cluster state
- Optical cluster state
- Greenberger–Horne–Zeilinger (GHZ) state
- Dicke model
- Jaynes–Cummings model
