= Yanhong Xiao =

Chinese physicist

Yanhong Xiao (Chinese: 肖艳红) is a Chinese physicist specializing in experimental atomic, molecular, and optical physics including quantum optics, the quantum metrology of atomic ensembles, and the use of spin squeezing to surpass the quantum limit on measurements. She is a professor of physics at Fudan University, and a professor in the State Key Lab of Quantum Optics and Quantum Optics Devices of the Institute of Laser Spectroscopy at Shanxi University.

== Education and career ==
Xiao earned a bachelor's degree in physics from Tsinghua University in 1998, and a master's degree in electronic engineering from Tsinghua University in 2000. She continued her studies at Harvard University in the US, where she received a Ph.D. in applied physics in 2004.

After five years of postdoctoral research in the Atomic and Molecular Department of the Harvard–Smithsonian Center for Astrophysics, she became a professor at Fudan University in 2009.

== Recognition ==
Xiao was named as a Fellow of the American Physical Society (APS) in 2024, after a nomination from the APS Division of Atomic, Molecular & Optical Physics, "for advancements in quantum metrology and quantum optics using atoms and light, including spin squeezing in large ensembles".
