= Symmetric logarithmic derivative =

The symmetric logarithmic derivative is an important quantity in quantum metrology, and is related to the quantum Fisher information.

== Definition ==
Let $\rho$ and $A$ be two operators, where $\rho$ is Hermitian and positive semi-definite. In most applications, $\rho$ and $A$ fulfill further properties, that also $A$ is Hermitian and $\rho$ is a density matrix (which is also trace-normalized), but these are not required for the definition.

The symmetric logarithmic derivative $L_\varrho(A)$ is defined implicitly by the equation

$$i[\varrho,A]=\frac{1}{2} \{\varrho, L_\varrho(A)\}$$

where $[X,Y]=XY-YX$ is the commutator and $\{X,Y\}=XY+YX$ is the anticommutator. Explicitly, it is given by

$$L_\varrho(A)=2i\sum_{k,l} \frac{\lambda_k-\lambda_l}{\lambda_k+\lambda_l} \langle k \vert A \vert l\rangle \vert k\rangle \langle l \vert$$

where $\lambda_k$ and $\vert k\rangle$ are the eigenvalues and eigenstates of $\varrho$, i.e. $\varrho\vert k\rangle=\lambda_k\vert k\rangle$ and $\varrho=\sum_k \lambda_k \vert k\rangle\langle k\vert$.

Formally, the map from operator $A$ to operator $L_\varrho(A)$ is a (linear) superoperator.

== Properties ==
The symmetric logarithmic derivative is linear in $A$:

$$L_\varrho(\mu A)=\mu L_\varrho(A)$$
$$L_\varrho(A+B)=L_\varrho(A)+L_\varrho(B)$$

The symmetric logarithmic derivative is Hermitian if its argument $A$ is Hermitian:

$$A=A^\dagger\Rightarrow[L_\varrho(A)]^\dagger=L_\varrho(A)$$

The derivative of the expression $\exp(-i\theta A)\varrho\exp(+i\theta A)$ w.r.t. $\theta$ at $\theta=0$ reads

$$\frac{\partial}{\partial\theta}\Big[\exp(-i\theta A)\varrho\exp(+i\theta A)\Big]\bigg\vert_{\theta=0} = i(\varrho A-A\varrho) = i[\varrho,A] = \frac{1}{2}\{\varrho, L_\varrho(A)\}$$

where the last equality is per definition of $L_\varrho(A)$; this relation is the origin of the name "symmetric logarithmic derivative". Further, we obtain the Taylor expansion

$$\exp(-i\theta A)\varrho\exp(+i\theta A) = \varrho + \underbrace{\frac{1}{2}\theta\{\varrho, L_\varrho(A)\}}_{=i\theta[\varrho,A]} + \mathcal{O}(\theta^2)$$.
