= Permutationally invariant quantum state tomography =

Efficient reconstruction of quantum states based on measurements

Permutationally invariant quantum state tomography (PI quantum state tomography) is a method for the partial determination of the state of a quantum system consisting of many subsystems.

In general, the number of parameters needed to describe the quantum mechanical state of a system consisting of $N$ subsystems is increasing exponentially with $N.$ For instance, for an $N$-qubit system, $2^{(N+1)}-2$ real parameters are needed to describe the state vector of a pure state, or $2^{2N} -1$ real parameters are needed to describe the density matrix of a mixed state. Quantum state tomography is a method to determine all these parameters from a series of measurements on many independent and identically prepared systems. Thus, in the case of full quantum state tomography, the number of measurements needed scales exponentially with the number of particles or qubits.

For large systems, the determination of the entire quantum state is no longer possible in practice and one is interested in methods that determine only a subset of the parameters necessary to characterize the quantum state that still contains important information about the state. Permutationally invariant quantum tomography is such a method. PI quantum tomography only measures $\varrho_{\rm PI},$ the permutationally invariant part of the density matrix. For the procedure, it is sufficient to carry out local measurements on the subsystems. If the state is close to being permutationally invariant, which is the case in many practical situations, then $\varrho_{\rm PI}$ is close to the density matrix of the system. Even if the state is not permutationally invariant, $\varrho_{\rm PI}$ can still be used for entanglement detection and computing relevant operator expectations values. Thus, the procedure does not assume the permutationally invariance of the quantum state. The number of independent real parameters of $\varrho_{\rm PI}$ for $N$ qubits scales as $\sim N^3.$ The number of local measurement settings scales as $\sim N^2.$ Thus, permutationally invariant quantum tomography is considered manageable even for large $N$. In other words, permutationally invariant quantum tomography is considered scalable.

The method can be used, for example, for the reconstruction of the density matrices of systems with more than 10 particles, for photonic systems, for trapped cold ions or systems in cold atoms.

== The permutationally invariant part of the density matrix ==
PI state tomography reconstructs the permutationally invariant part of the density matrix, which is defined as the equal mixture of the quantum states obtained after permuting the particles in all the possible ways

$$\varrho_{\rm PI}=\frac{1}{N!} \sum_k \Pi_k \varrho \Pi_k^\dagger,$$

where $\Pi_k$ denotes the kth permutation. For instance, for $N=2$ we have two permutations. $\Pi_1$ leaves the order of the two particles unchanged. $\Pi_2$ exchanges the two particles. In general, for $N$ particles, we have $N!$ permutations.

It is easy to see that $\varrho_{\rm PI}$ is the density matrix that is obtained if the order of the particles is not taken into account. This corresponds to an experiment in which a subset of $N$ particles is randomly selected from a larger ensemble. The state of this smaller group is of course permutationally invariant.

The number of degrees of freedom of $\varrho_{\rm PI}$ scales polynomially with the number of particles. For a system of $N$ qubits (spin-$1/2$ particles) the number of real degrees of freedom is

$$\binom{N+3}{N}-1=\frac{1}6(N^3+6N^2+11N).$$

== The measurements needed to determine the permutationally invariant part of the density matrix ==
To determine these degrees of freedom,

$$\binom{N+2}{N}=\frac{(N+2)(N+1)}2=\frac1 2 (N^2+3N+2)$$

local measurement settings are needed. Here, a local measurement settings means that the operator $A_j$ is to be measured on each particle. By repeating the measurement and collecting enough data, all two-point, three-point and higher order correlations can be determined.

== Efficient determination of a physical state ==
So far we have discussed that the number of measurements scales polynomially with the number of qubits.

However, for using the method in practice, the entire tomographic procedure must be scalable. Thus, we need to store the state in the computer in a scalable way. Clearly, the straightforward way of storing the $N$-qubit state in a $2^N\times2^N$ density matrix is not scalable. However, $\varrho_{\rm PI}$ is a blockdiagonal matrix due to its permutational invariance and thus it can be stored much more efficiently.

Moreover, it is well known that due to statistical fluctuations and systematic errors the density matrix obtained from the measured state by linear inversion is not positive semidefinite and it has some negative eigenvalues. An important step in a typical tomography is fitting a physical, i. e., positive semidefinite density matrix on the tomographic data. This step often represents a bottleneck in the overall process in full state tomography. However, PI tomography, as we have just discussed, allows the density matrix to be stored much more efficiently, which also allows an efficient fitting using convex optimization, which also guarantees that the solution is a global optimum.

== Characteristics of the method ==
PI tomography is commonly used in experiments involving permutationally invariant states. If the density matrix $\varrho_{\rm PI}$ obtained by PI tomography is entangled, then density matrix of the system, $\varrho$ is also entangled. For this reason, the usual methods for entanglement verification, such as entanglement witnesses or the Peres–Horodecki criterion, can be applied to $\varrho_{\rm PI}$. Remarkably, the entanglement detection carried out in this way does not assume that the quantum system itself is permutationally invariant.

Moreover, the expectation value of any permutaionally invariant operator is the same for $\varrho$ and for $\varrho_{\rm PI}.$ Very relevant examples of such operators are projectors to symmetric states, such as the Greenberger–Horne–Zeilinger state, the W state and symmetric Dicke states. Thus, we can obtain the fidelity with respect to the above-mentioned quantum states as the expectation value of the corresponding projectors in the state $\varrho_{\rm PI}.$

The quantum fidelity of $\varrho_{\rm PI}$ and $\varrho$ can be bounded from below as

$$F(\varrho,\varrho_{\rm PI})\ge \langle P_s \rangle_\varrho^2,$$

where $P_s$ is the projector to the symmetric subspace. For symmetric states, ${\langle} P_s \rangle=1$ holds. This way, we can lower bound the difference knowing only $\varrho_{\rm PI}.$

== Links to other approaches ==
There are other approaches for tomography that need fewer measurements than full quantum state tomography. As we have discussed, PI tomography is typically most useful for quantum states that are close to being permutionally invariant. Compressed sensing is especially suited for low rank states. Matrix product state tomography is most suitable for, e.g., cluster states and ground states of spin models. Permutationally invariant tomography can be combined with compressed sensing. In this case, the number of local measurement settings needed can even be smaller than for permutationally invariant tomography.

== Experiments ==
Permutationally invariant tomography has been tested experimentally for a four-qubit symmetric Dicke state, and also for a six-qubit symmetric Dicke in photons, and has been compared to full state tomography and compressed sensing. A simulation of permutationally invariant tomography shows that reconstruction of a positive semidefinite density matrix of 20 qubits from measured data is possible in a few minutes on a standard computer. The hybrid method combining permutationally invariant tomography and compressed sensing has also been tested.
