= Welch bounds =

In mathematics, Welch bounds are a family of inequalities pertinent to the problem of evenly spreading a set of unit vectors in a vector space. The bounds are important tools in the design and analysis of certain methods in telecommunication engineering, particularly in coding theory. The bounds were originally published in a 1974 paper by L. R. Welch.

== Mathematical statement ==
If $\{x_1,\ldots,x_m\}$ are unit vectors in $\mathbb{C}^n$, define $c_\max = \max_{i\neq j} |\langle x_i, x_j \rangle|$, where $\langle\cdot,\cdot\rangle$ is the usual inner product on $\mathbb{C}^n$. Then the following inequalities hold for $k=1,2,\dots$:
$$(c_\max)^{2k} \geq \frac{1}{m-1} \left[ \frac{m}{\binom{n+k-1}{k}}-1 \right].$$
When $k = 1$, this reduces to
$$(c_\max)^{2} \geq \frac{m-n}{n(m-1)}.$$
Welch bounds are also sometimes stated in terms of the averaged squared overlap between the set of vectors. In this case, one has the inequality
$$\frac{1}{m^2}\sum_{i,j=1}^m |\langle x_i,x_j\rangle|^{2k} \ge \frac{1}{\binom{n+k-1}{k}}.$$

== Applicability ==
If $m\leq n$, then the vectors $\{x_i\}$ can form an orthonormal set in $\mathbb{C}^n$. In this case, $c_\max=0$ and the bounds are vacuous. Consequently, interpretation of the bounds is only meaningful if $m>n$. This will be assumed throughout the remainder of this article.

== Proof for k = 1 ==
The "first Welch bound," corresponding to $k=1$, is by far the most commonly used in applications. Its proof proceeds in two steps, each of which depends on a more basic mathematical inequality. The first step invokes the Cauchy–Schwarz inequality and begins by considering the $m\times m$ Gram matrix $G$ of the vectors $\{x_i\}$; i.e.,

$$G=\left[ \begin{array}{ccc} \langle x_1, x_1 \rangle & \cdots & \langle x_1, x_m \rangle \\ \vdots & \ddots & \vdots \\   \langle x_m, x_1 \rangle & \cdots & \langle x_m, x_m \rangle \end{array}\right]$$

The trace of $G$ is equal to the sum of its eigenvalues. Because the rank of $G$ is at most $n$, and it is a positive semidefinite matrix, $G$ has at most $n$ positive eigenvalues with its remaining eigenvalues all equal to zero. Writing the non-zero eigenvalues of $G$ as $\lambda_1,\ldots,\lambda_r$ with $r\leq n$ and applying the Cauchy-Schwarz inequality to the inner product of an $r$-vector of ones with a vector whose components are these eigenvalues yields

$$(\mathrm{Tr}\;G)^2 = \left( \sum_{i=1}^r \lambda_i \right)^2 \leq r \sum_{i=1}^r \lambda_i^2 \leq n \sum_{i=1}^m \lambda_i^2$$

The square of the Frobenius norm (Hilbert–Schmidt norm) of $G$ satisfies

$$||G||^2 = \sum_{i=1}^{m} \sum_{j=1}^m |\langle x_i , x_j \rangle|^2 = \sum_{i=1}^m \lambda_i^2$$

Taking this together with the preceding inequality gives

$$\sum_{i=1}^m \sum_{j=1}^m |\langle x_i , x_j \rangle|^2\geq \frac{(\mathrm{Tr}\;G)^2}{n}$$

Because each $x_i$ has unit length, the elements on the main diagonal of $G$ are ones, and hence its trace is $\mathrm{Tr}\;G = m$. So,

$$\sum_{i=1}^{m} \sum_{j=1}^m |\langle x_i , x_j \rangle|^2 = m+\sum_{i\neq j} |\langle x_i , x_j \rangle|^2 \geq \frac{m^2}{n}$$

or

$$\sum_{i\neq j} |\langle x_i , x_j \rangle|^2 \geq \frac{m(m-n)}{n}$$

The second part of the proof uses an inequality encompassing the simple observation that the average of a set of non-negative numbers can be no greater than the largest number in the set. In mathematical notation, if $a_{\ell}\geq 0$ for $\ell=1,\ldots, L$, then

$$\frac{1}{L}\sum_{\ell=1}^L a_{\ell} \leq \max a_{\ell}$$

The previous expression has $m(m-1)$ non-negative terms in the sum, the largest of which is $c_\max^2$. So,

$$(c_\max)^2\geq \frac{1}{m(m-1)}\sum_{i\neq j} |\langle x_i , x_j \rangle|^2\geq\frac{m-n}{n(m-1)}$$

or

$$(c_\max)^2\geq \frac{m-n}{n(m-1)}$$

which is precisely the inequality given by Welch in the case that $k=1$.

== Achieving the Welch bounds ==
In certain telecommunications applications, it is desirable to construct sets of vectors that meet the Welch bounds with equality. Several techniques have been introduced to obtain so-called Welch Bound Equality (WBE) sets of vectors for the $k=1$ bound.

The proof given above shows that two separate mathematical inequalities are incorporated into the Welch bound when $k=1$. The Cauchy–Schwarz inequality is met with equality when the two vectors involved are collinear. In the way it is used in the above proof, this occurs when all the non-zero eigenvalues of the Gram matrix $G$ are equal, which happens precisely when the vectors $\{x_1,\ldots,x_m\}$ constitute a tight frame for $\mathbb{C}^n$.

The other inequality in the proof is satisfied with equality if and only if $|\langle x_i, x_j \rangle|$ is the same for every choice of $i\neq j$. In this case, the vectors are equiangular. So this Welch bound is met with equality if and only if the set of vectors $\{x_i\}$ is an equiangular tight frame in $\mathbb{C}^n$.

Similarly, the Welch bounds stated in terms of average squared overlap, are saturated for all $k\le t$ if and only if the set of vectors is a $t$-design in the complex projective space $\mathbb{CP}^{n-1}$.

== See also ==
- Spherical design
- Quantum t-design
- Equiangular lines
