= Randomized benchmarking =

Method for assessing quantum computer hardware capabilities

Randomized benchmarking is an experimental method for measuring the average error rates of quantum computing hardware platforms. The protocol estimates the average error rates by implementing long sequences of randomly sampled quantum gate operations. Randomized benchmarking is the industry-standard protocol used by quantum hardware developers such as IBM and Google to test the performance of the quantum operations.

The original theory of randomized benchmarking, proposed by Joseph Emerson and collaborators, considered the implementation of sequences of Haar-random operations, but this had several practical limitations. The now-standard protocol for randomized benchmarking (RB) relies on uniformly random Clifford operations, as proposed in 2006 by Dankert et al. as an application of the theory of unitary t-designs. In current usage randomized benchmarking sometimes refers to the broader family of generalizations of the 2005 protocol involving different random gate sets that can identify various features of the strength and type of errors affecting the elementary quantum gate operations. Randomized benchmarking protocols are an important means of verifying and validating quantum operations and are also routinely used for the optimization of quantum control procedures.

== Overview ==
Randomized benchmarking offers several key advantages over alternative approaches to error characterization. For example, the number of experimental procedures required for full characterization of errors (called tomography) grows exponentially with the number of quantum bits (called qubits). This makes tomographic methods impractical for even small systems of just 3 or 4 qubits. In contrast, randomized benchmarking protocols are the only known approaches to error characterization that scale efficiently as number of qubits in the system increases. Thus RB can be applied in practice to characterize errors in arbitrarily large quantum processors. Additionally, in experimental quantum computing, procedures for state preparation and measurement (SPAM) are also error-prone, and thus quantum process tomography is unable to distinguish errors associated with gate operations from errors associated with SPAM. In contrast, RB protocols are robust to state-preparation and measurement errors.

Randomized benchmarking protocols estimate key features of the errors that affect a set of quantum operations by examining how the observed fidelity of the final quantum state decreases as the length of the random sequence increases. If the set of operations satisfies certain mathematical properties, such as comprising a sequence of twirls with unitary two-designs, then the measured decay can be shown to be an invariant exponential with a rate fixed uniquely by features of the error model.

== History ==
Randomized benchmarking was proposed in Scalable noise estimation with random unitary operators, where it was shown that long sequences of quantum gates sampled uniformly at random from the Haar measure on the group SU(d) would lead to an exponential decay at a rate that was uniquely fixed by the error model. Emerson, Alicki and Zyczkowski also showed, under the assumption of gate-independent errors, that the measured decay rate is directly related to an important figure of merit, the average gate fidelity and independent of the choice of initial state and any errors in the initial state, as well as the specific random sequences of quantum gates. This protocol applied for arbitrary dimension d and an arbitrary number n of qubits, where d=2^{n}. The SU(d) RB protocol had two important limitations that were overcome in a modified protocol proposed by Dankert et al., who proposed sampling the gate operations uniformly at random from any unitary two-design, such as the Clifford group. They proved that this would produce the same exponential decay rate as the random SU(d) version of the protocol proposed in Emerson et al.. This follows from the observation that a random sequence of gates is equivalent to an independent sequence of twirls under that group, as conjectured in and later proven in. This Clifford-group approach to Randomized Benchmarking is the now standard method for assessing error rates in quantum computers. A variation of this protocol was proposed by NIST in 2008 for the first experimental implementation of an RB-type for single qubit gates. However, the sampling of random gates in the NIST protocol was later proven not to reproduce any unitary two-design. The NIST RB protocol was later shown to also produce an exponential fidelity decay, albeit with a rate that depends on non-invariant features of the error model

In recent years a rigorous theoretical framework has been developed for Clifford-group RB protocols to show that they work reliably under very broad experimental conditions. In 2011 and 2012, Magesan et al. proved that the exponential decay rate is fully robust to arbitrary state preparation and measurement errors (SPAM). They also proved a connection between the average gate fidelity and diamond norm metric of error that is relevant to the fault-tolerant threshold. They also provided evidence that the observed decay was exponential and related to the average gate fidelity even if the error model varied across the gate operations, so-called gate-dependent errors, which is the experimentally realistic situation. In 2018, Wallman and Dugas et al., showed that, despite concerns raised in, even under very strong gate-dependence errors the standard RB protocols produces an exponential decay at a rate that precisely measures the average gate-fidelity of the experimentally relevant errors. The results of Wallman. in particular proved that the RB error rate is so robust to gate-dependent errors models that it provides an extremely sensitive tool for detecting non-Markovian errors. This follows because under a standard RB experiment only non-Markovian errors (including time-dependent Markovian errors) can produce a statistically significant deviation from an exponential decay

The standard RB protocol was first implemented for single qubit gate operations in 2012 at Yale on a superconducting qubit. A variation of this standard protocol that is only defined for single qubit operations was implemented by NIST in 2008 on a trapped ion. The first implementation of the standard RB protocol for two-qubit gates was performed in 2012 at NIST for a system of two trapped ions
