= Quantum metrology =

Application of quantum entanglement to high-precision measurement

Quantum metrology is the study of making high-resolution and highly sensitive measurements of physical parameters using quantum theory to describe the physical systems, particularly exploiting quantum entanglement and quantum squeezing. This field promises to develop measurement techniques that give better precision than the same measurement performed in a classical framework. Together with quantum hypothesis testing, it represents an important theoretical model at the basis of quantum sensing.

== Mathematical foundations ==
A basic task of quantum metrology is estimating the parameter $\theta$ of the unitary dynamics

$$\varrho(\theta)=\exp(-iH\theta)\varrho_0\exp(+iH\theta),$$

where $\varrho_0$ is the initial state of the system and $H$ is the Hamiltonian of the system. $\theta$ is estimated based on measurements on $\varrho(\theta).$

Typically, the system is composed of many particles, and the Hamiltonian is a sum of single-particle terms

$$H=\sum_k H_k,$$

where $H_k$ acts on the kth particle. In this case, there is no interaction between the particles, and we talk about linear interferometers.

The achievable precision is bounded from below by the quantum Cramér-Rao bound as

$$(\Delta \theta)^2 \ge \frac 1 {m F_{\rm Q}[\varrho,H]},$$

where $m$ is the number of independent repetitions and $F_{\rm Q}[\varrho,H]$ is the quantum Fisher information.

== Examples ==
One example of note is the use of the NOON state in a Mach–Zehnder interferometer to perform accurate phase measurements. A similar effect can be produced using less exotic states such as squeezed states. In quantum illumination protocols, two-mode squeezed states are widely studied to overcome the limit of classical states represented in coherent states. In atomic ensembles, spin squeezed states can be used for phase measurements.

== Applications ==
An important application of quantum metrology is the detection of gravitational waves in projects such as LIGO and Virgo. Advanced LIGO has implemented frequency-dependent quantum squeezing to reduce quantum noise (including shot noise and radiation pressure noise) and surpass the standard quantum limit. This technology has been deployed since the start of the O4 observing run in May 2023, providing broadband sensitivity improvements and enabling more precise measurements of spacetime distortions.

=== Emerging applications in biological systems ===
Quantum metrology is extending into biological systems by engineering quantum effects in biomolecules. A 2026 study from the University of Oxford demonstrated magneto-sensitive fluorescent proteins (MFPs) that use quantum spin resonance to interact with magnetic fields and radio waves via light-triggered quantum processes. This enables quantum-enhanced sensing for molecular imaging and biological detection, linking quantum metrology to biotechnology.

== Scaling and the effect of noise ==
A central question of quantum metrology is how the precision, i.e., the variance of the parameter estimation, scales with the number of particles. Classical interferometers cannot overcome the shot-noise limit. This limit is also frequently called standard quantum limit (SQL)

$$(\Delta \theta)^2\ge \tfrac{1}{mN},$$

where $N$ is the number of particles. Shot-noise limit is known to be asymptotically achievable using coherent states and homodyne detection.

Quantum metrology can reach the Heisenberg limit given by

$$(\Delta \theta)^2\ge \tfrac{1}{mN^2}.$$

However, if uncorrelated local noise is present, then for large particle numbers the scaling of the precision returns to shot-noise scaling $(\Delta \theta)^2\propto \tfrac{1}{N}.$

== Relation to quantum information science ==
There are strong links between quantum metrology and quantum information science. It has been shown that quantum entanglement is needed to outperform classical interferometry in magnetometry with a fully polarized ensemble of spins. It has been proved that a similar relation is generally valid for any linear interferometer, independent of the details of the scheme. Moreover, higher and higher levels of multipartite entanglement is needed to achieve a better and better accuracy in parameter estimation. Additionally, entanglement in multiple degrees of freedom of quantum systems (known as "hyperentanglement"), can be used to enhance precision, with enhancement arising from entanglement in each degree of freedom.

== See also ==
- Dimensional metrology
- Forensic metrology
- Gaussian state
- Quantum metrological gain
- Smart Metrology
- Time metrology
