= Entanglement depth =

In quantum physics, entanglement depth characterizes the strength of multiparticle entanglement. An entanglement depth $k$ means that the quantum state of a particle ensemble cannot be described under the assumption that particles interacted with each other only in groups having fewer than $k$ particles. It has been used to characterize the quantum states created in experiments with cold gases.

== Definition ==
Entanglement depth appeared in the context of spin squeezing. It turned out that to achieve larger and larger spin squeezing, and thus larger and larger precision in parameter estimation, a larger and larger entanglement depth is needed.

Later it was formalized in terms of convex sets of quantum states, independent of spin squeezing as follows. Let us consider a pure state that is the tensor product of multi-particle quantum states

$|\Psi\rangle=|\phi_1\rangle\otimes|\phi_2\rangle\otimes ... \otimes|\phi_n\rangle.$

The pure state $|\Psi\rangle$ is said to be $k$-producible if all $\phi_i$ are states of at most $k$ particles. A mixed state is called $k$-producible, if it is a mixture of pure states that are all at most $k$-producible. The $k$-producible mixed states form a convex set.

A quantum state contains at least multiparticle entanglement of $k+1$ particles, if it is not $k$-producible. A $N$-particle state with $N$-entanglement is called genuine multipartite entangled.

Finally, a quantum state has an entanglement depth $k$, if it is $k$-producible, but not $(k-1)$-producible.

It was possible to detect the entanglement depth close to states different from spin-squeezed states. Since there is not a general method to detect multipartite entanglement, these methods had to be tailored to experiments with various relevant quantum states.

Thus, entanglement criteria has been developed to detect entanglement close to symmetric Dicke states with $\langle J_z\rangle=0.$ They are very different from spin-squeezed states, since they do not have a large spin polarization. They can provide Heisenberg limited metrology, while they are more robust to particle loss than Greenberger-Horne-Zeilinger (GHZ) states.

There are also criteria for detecting the entanglement depth in planar-squeezed states. Planar squeezed states are quantum states that can be used to estimate a rotation angle that is not expected to be small.

Finally, multipartite entanglement can be detected based on the metrological usefulness of the quantum state. The criteria applied are based on bounds on the quantum Fisher information.

== Experiments ==
The entanglement criterion in Ref. has been used in many experiments with cold gases in spin-squeezed states.

There have also been experiments in cold gases for detecting multipartite entanglement in symmetric Dicke states.

There have been also experiments with Dicke states that detected entanglement based on metrological usefulness in cold gases and in photons.
