= Spherical design =

A spherical design, part of combinatorial design theory in mathematics, is a finite set of N points on the d-dimensional unit d-sphere S^{d} such that the average value of any polynomial f of degree t or less on the set equals the average value of f on the whole sphere (that is, the integral of f over S^{d} divided by the area or measure of S^{d}). Such a set is often called a spherical t-design to indicate the value of t, which is a fundamental parameter. The concept of a spherical design is due to Delsarte, Goethals, and Seidel, although these objects were understood as particular examples of cubature formulas earlier.

Spherical designs can be of value in approximation theory, in statistics for experimental design, in combinatorics, and in geometry. The main problem is to find examples, given d and t, that are not too large; however, such examples may be hard to come by. Spherical t-designs have also recently been appropriated in quantum mechanics in the form of quantum t-designs with various applications to quantum information theory and quantum computing.

== Existence of spherical designs ==
The existence and structure of spherical designs on the circle were studied in depth by Hong. Shortly thereafter, Seymour and Zaslavsky proved that such designs exist of all sufficiently large sizes; that is, given positive integers d and t, there is a number N(d,t) such that for every N ≥ N(d,t) there exists a spherical t-design of N points in dimension d. However, their proof gave no idea of how big N(d,t) is.

Mimura constructively found conditions in terms of the number of points and the dimension which characterize exactly when spherical 2-designs exist. Maximally sized collections of equiangular lines (up to identification of lines as antipodal points on the sphere) are examples of minimal sized spherical 5-designs. There are many sporadic small spherical designs; many of them are related to finite group actions on the sphere.

In 2013, Bondarenko, Radchenko, and Viazovska obtained the asymptotic upper bound $N(d,t)<C_d t^d$ for all positive integers d and t. This asymptotically matches the lower bound given originally by Delsarte, Goethals, and Seidel. The value of C_{d} is currently unknown, while exact values of $N(d,t)$ are known in relatively few cases.

== See also ==
- Thomson problem
