= Quantum Cramér–Rao bound =

Bound in quantum mechanics

The quantum Cramér–Rao bound is the quantum analogue of the classical Cramér–Rao bound. It bounds the achievable precision in parameter estimation with a quantum system:

$(\Delta \theta)^2 \ge \frac 1 {m F_{\rm Q}[\varrho,H]},$

where $m$ is the number of independent repetitions, and $F_{\rm Q}[\varrho,H]$ is the quantum Fisher information.

Here, $\varrho$ is the state of the system and $H$ is the Hamiltonian of the system. When considering a unitary dynamics of the type

$\varrho(\theta)=\exp(-iH\theta)\varrho_0\exp(+iH\theta),$

where $\varrho_0$ is the initial state of the system, $\theta$ is the parameter to be estimated based on measurements on $\varrho(\theta).$

== Simple derivation from the Heisenberg uncertainty relation ==
Let us consider the decomposition of the density matrix to pure components as

$\varrho=\sum_k p_k \vert\Psi_k\rangle\langle\Psi_k\vert.$

The Heisenberg uncertainty relation is valid for all $\vert\Psi_k\rangle$

$(\Delta A)^2_{\Psi_k}(\Delta B)^2_{\Psi_k}\ge \frac 1 4 |\langle i[A,B] \rangle_{\Psi_k}|^2.$

From these, employing the Cauchy–Schwarz inequality we arrive at

$(\Delta\theta)^2_A \ge \frac{1}{4\min_{\{p_k,\Psi_k\}}[\sum_k p_k (\Delta B)_{\Psi_k}^2]}.$

Here

$(\Delta\theta)^2_A= \frac{(\Delta A)^2}{|\partial_{\theta}\langle A \rangle|^2}=\frac{(\Delta A)^2}{|\langle i[A,B] \rangle|^2}$

is the error propagation formula, which roughly tells us how well $\theta$ can be estimated by measuring $A.$ Moreover, the convex roof of the variance is given as

$\min_{\{p_k,\Psi_k\}}\left[\sum_k p_k (\Delta B)_{\Psi_k}^2\right]=\frac1 4 F_Q[\varrho, B],$

where $F_Q[\varrho, B]$ is the quantum Fisher information.
