= Cluster state =

Entangled state of qubits

In quantum information and quantum computing, a cluster state is a type of highly entangled state of multiple qubits. Cluster states are generated in lattices of qubits with Ising type interactions. A cluster C is a connected subset of a d-dimensional lattice, and a cluster state is a pure state of the qubits located on C. They are different from other types of entangled states such as GHZ states or W states in that it is more difficult to eliminate quantum entanglement (via projective measurements) in the case of cluster states. Another way of thinking of cluster states is as a particular instance of graph states, where the underlying graph is a connected subset of a d-dimensional lattice. Cluster states are especially useful in the context of the one-way quantum computer. For a comprehensible introduction to the topic see Briegel (2009).

Formally, cluster states $|\phi_{\{\kappa\}}\rangle_{C}$ are states which obey the set eigenvalue equations:

$$K^{(a)} {\left|\phi_{\{\kappa\}}\right\rangle_{C}} =(-1)^{\kappa_{a}} {\left|\phi_{\{\kappa\}}\right\rangle_{C}}$$

where $K^{(a)}$ are the correlation operators

$$K^{(a)} = \sigma_x^{(a)} \bigotimes_{b\in \mathrm{N}(a)} \sigma_z^{(b)}$$

with $\sigma_x$ and $\sigma_z$ being Pauli matrices, $N(a)$ denoting the neighbourhood of $a$ and $\{\kappa_a\in\{0,1\}|a\in C\}$ being a set of binary parameters specifying the particular instance of a cluster state.

== Examples with qubits ==
Here are some examples of one-dimensional cluster states (d=1), for $n=2,3,4$, where $n$ is the number of qubits. We take $\kappa_a=0$ for all $a$, which means the cluster state is the unique simultaneous eigenstate that has corresponding eigenvalue 1 under all correlation operators. In each example the set of correlation operators $\{K^{(a)}\}_a$and the corresponding cluster state is listed.

- $n=2$
  $\{\sigma_x\sigma_z,\ \sigma_z\sigma_x\}$

$|\phi \rangle = \frac{1}{\sqrt{2}}(|0+\rangle + |1-\rangle)$
This is an EPR-pair (up to local transformations).

- $n=3$

$$\{ \sigma_x\sigma_z I,\ \sigma_z\sigma_x \sigma_z,\ I\sigma_z\sigma_x\}$$
$|\phi\rangle=\frac{1}{\sqrt{2}}(|+0+\rangle + |-1-\rangle )$
This is the GHZ-state (up to local transformations).

- $n=4$

$$\{ \sigma_x\sigma_z I I,\ \sigma_z\sigma_x \sigma_z I,\ I\sigma_z\sigma_x\sigma_z,\ II \sigma_z\sigma_x \}$$
$$|\phi\rangle=\frac{1}{2}(|+0+0\rangle + |+0-1\rangle + |-1+0\rangle - |-1-1\rangle)$$.
This is not a GHZ-state and can not be converted to a GHZ-state with local operations.

In all examples $I$ is the identity operator, and tensor products are omitted. The states above can be obtained from the all zero state $|0\ldots 0 \rangle$ by first applying a Hadamard gate to every qubit, and then a controlled-Z gate between all qubits that are adjacent to each other.

== Experimental creation of cluster states ==
Cluster states can be realized experimentally. One way to create a cluster state is by encoding logical qubits into the polarization of photons, one common encoding is the following:

$$\begin{cases}
|0\rangle_{\rm L} \longleftrightarrow |\rm H\rangle\\
|1\rangle_{\rm L} \longleftrightarrow |\rm V\rangle
\end{cases}$$

This is not the only possible encoding, however it is one of the simplest: with this encoding entangled pairs can be created experimentally through spontaneous parametric down-conversion. The entangled pairs that can be generated this way have the form

$|\psi\rangle = \frac{1}{\sqrt{2}}\big(|\rm H\rangle|\rm H\rangle+e^{i\phi}|\rm V\rangle|\rm V\rangle\big)$

equivalent to the logical state

$|\psi\rangle = \frac{1}{\sqrt{2}}\big(|0\rangle|0\rangle + e^{i\phi}|1\rangle|1\rangle\big)$

for the two choices of the phase $\phi = 0, \pi$ the two Bell states $|\Phi^+\rangle, |\Phi^-\rangle$ are obtained: these are themselves two examples of two-qubits cluster states. Through the use of linear optic devices as beam-splitters or wave-plates these Bell states can interact and form more complex cluster states. Cluster states have been created also in optical lattices of cold atoms.

== Entanglement criteria and Bell inequalities for cluster states ==
After a cluster state $\rho$ was created in an experiment, it is important to verify that indeed, an entangled quantum state has been created. The fidelity with respect to the $N$-qubit cluster state $|C_N\rangle$ is given by

$F_{CN}={\rm Tr}(\rho |C_N\rangle\langle C_N|),$

It has been shown that if $F_{CN}>1/2$, then the state $\rho$ has genuine multiparticle entanglement. Thus, one can obtain an entanglement witness detecting entanglement close the cluster states as

$W_{CN}=\frac1 2 {\rm Identity}- |C_N\rangle\langle C_N|.$

where $\langle W_{CN} \rangle <0$ signals genuine multiparticle entanglement.

Such a witness cannot be measured directly. It has to be decomposed to a sum of correlations terms, which can then be measured. However, for large systems this approach can be difficult.

There are also entanglement witnesses that work in very large systems, and they also detect genuine multipartite entanglement close to cluster states. They need only the minimal two local measurement settings. Similar conditions can also be used to put a lower bound on the fidelity with respect to an ideal cluster state. These criteria have been used first in an experiment realizing four-qubit cluster states with photons. These approaches have also been used to propose methods for detecting entanglement in a smaller part of a large cluster state or graph state realized in optical lattices.

Bell inequalities have also been developed for cluster states. All these entanglement conditions and Bell inequalities are based on the stabilizer formalism.

== See also ==
- Bell state
- Graph state
- Optical cluster state
- Dicke state
