= Spin squeezing =

Quantum process reducing the variance of spin along a particular axis

Spin squeezing is a quantum process that decreases the variance of one of the angular momentum quadratures below the standard quantum limit, at the expense of increasing variance in another, in an ensemble of particles with spin. This is achieved by somehow entangling the individual spin states within the ensemble.The quantum states obtained are called spin squeezed states. Such states have been proposed for quantum metrology, to allow a better precision for estimating a rotation angle than classical interferometers.

== Mathematical definition ==
Spin squeezed states for an ensemble of spins have been defined analogously to squeezed states of a bosonic mode. Spin squeezed states are often defined with reference to an ensemble of spin-1/2 particles. These particles have 3 quadratures $(J_x, J_y, J_z)$ along which spin can be measured. Each of these quadratures has eigenvalues $\pm \frac 1 2$.

The way that uncertainty manifests itself in this quantum system derives from the commutation relations between these different spin operators:
$$[J_i, J_j] = i \epsilon_{ijk} J_k$$
where $\epsilon_{ijk}$ is the Levi-Cevita symbol. Therefore, by the Heisenberg uncertainty relation,
$$(\Delta J_x)^2(\Delta J_y)^2 \geqslant \frac 1 4  |\langle J_z \rangle |^2$$

For an ensemble of spins, the $J_i$ are the collective angular momentum components defined as
$$J_i=\sum_n j_i^{(n)},$$
where $j_i^{(n)}$ are the single particle angular momentum components.

We say that the state is spin-squeezed in the $x$-direction, if the variance of the $x$-component is smaller than the square root of the right-hand side of the inequality above
$$(\Delta J_x) < \frac 1 2 |\langle J_z \rangle |.$$
A different definition was based on using states with a reduced spin-variance for metrology.

== Spin Squeezing Parameter ==
The spin squeezing parameter characterizes how much the uncertainty has been reduced in the squeezed quadrature. For a single spin in an eigenstate of $J_z$, it is clear that the uncertainty will be evenly distributed between the $J_x$ and $J_y$ quadratures. In this case, both $\Delta J_x$ and $\Delta J_y$ are equal to 1/4.

For a system of $N$ spins, if the spins are uncorrelated and all are in the $J_z = + \frac 1 2$ state, then $\Delta J_x = \Delta J_y = N \cdot \frac 1 4$. However, if correlations—in other words entanglement—are present, it is possible to achieve greater certainty in either $J_x$ or $J_y$ at the expense of greater uncertainty in the other so that the Heisenberg inequality is still maintained.

This motivates the definition of the spin squeezing parameter. For Kitagawa Ueda systems, which the discussion above is based on, this is defined as $\xi_s^2 = 4 \frac { (\Delta J_{\perp_{min}})^2}{N}$, where $J_{\perp_{min}}$ is the quadrature with the minimum uncertainty.

Clearly when there is no squeezing, $\xi_s^2$ will be equal to 1, and when the state is squeezed the parameter will be less than 1.

== Relations to quantum entanglement ==
Spin squeezed states can be proven to be entangled based on measuring the spin length and the variance of the spin in an orthogonal direction.

If $\xi_{\rm s}^2$ is smaller than $1$ then the state is entangled. It has also been shown that a higher and higher level of multipartite entanglement is needed to achieve a larger and larger degree of spin squeezing.

== Experiments with atomic ensembles ==
Experiments have been carried out with cold or even room temperature atomic ensembles. In this case, the atoms do not interact with each other. Hence, in order to entangle them, they make them interact with light which is then measured. A 20 dB (100 times) spin squeezing has been obtained in such a system. Simultaneous spin squeezing of two ensembles, which interact with the same light field, has been used to entangle the two ensembles. Spin squeezing can be enhanced by using cavities.

Cold gas experiments have also been carried out with Bose-Einstein Condensates (BEC). In this case, the spin squeezing is due to the interaction between the atoms.

Most experiments have been carried out using only two internal states of the particles, hence, effectively with spin-$1/2$ particles. There are also experiments aiming at spin squeezing with particles of a higher spin. Nuclear-electron spin squeezing within the atoms, rather than interatomic spin squeezing, has also been created in room temperature gases.

== Creating large spin squeezing ==
Experiments with atomic ensembles are usually implemented in free-space with Gaussian laser beams. To enhance the spin squeezing effect towards generating non-Gaussian states, which are metrologically useful, the free-space apparatuses are not enough. Cavities and nanophotonic waveguides have been used to enhance the squeezing effect with less atoms. For the waveguide systems, the atom-light coupling and the squeezing effect can be enhanced using the evanescent field near to the waveguides, and the type of atom-light interaction can be controlled by choosing a proper polarization state of the guided input light, the internal state subspace of the atoms and the geometry of the trapping shape. Spin squeezing protocols using nanophotonic waveguides based on the birefringence effect and the Faraday effect have been proposed. By optimizing the optical depth or cooperativity through controlling the geometric factors mentioned above, the Faraday protocol demonstrates that, to enhance the squeezing effect, one needs to find a geometry that generates weaker local electric field at the atom positions. This is counterintuitive, because usually to enhance atom-light coupling, a strong local field is required. But it opens the door to perform very precise measurement with little disruptions to the quantum system, which cannot be simultaneously satisfied with a strong field.

== Generalized spin squeezing ==
In entanglement theory, generalized spin squeezing also refers to any criterion that is given with the first and second moments of angular momentum coordinates, and detects entanglement in a quantum state. For a large ensemble of spin-1/2 particles a complete set of such relations have been found, which have been generalized to particles with an arbitrary spin. Apart from detecting entanglement in general, there are relations that detect multipartite entanglement. Some of the generalized spin-squeezing entanglement criteria have also a relation to quantum metrological tasks. For instance, planar squeezed states can be used to measure an unknown rotation angle optimally.

== Spin squeezing in interferometry ==
Squeezed states are widely used in quantum microscopy and interferometry, as they allow one to overcome the standard shot-noise limit (SNL). Interferometers rely on the interference of two coherent modes of the probing particles—one that passes through the scanned medium and another that propagates in vacuum. The measured quantity that maps to the scanned image is the relative phase between these two modes. Therefore, reducing the phase variance is crucial. For uncorrelated particles, the phase uncertainty is bounded by the standard quantum limit (SQL): $\Delta\phi \leq \frac{1}{\sqrt{N}}$, where $N$ is the number of particles per measured pixel.

Driven by the increasing demand for highly precise measurement tools, many efforts have been made to surpass the SQL. The ultimate theoretical bound is known as the Heisenberg limit, where interferometric precision scales as $\frac{1}{N}$. The potential improvement in phase sensitivity is substantial, enabling resolutions far beyond those achievable with conventional interferometers. While the SQL bounds the phase variance as $|\Delta\phi|^2 \propto \frac{1}{N}$, the Heisenberg limit suggests a variance of $|\Delta\phi|^2 \propto \frac{1}{N^2}$. In fields such as biology, where samples may be sensitive to total illumination, approaching the Heisenberg limit could provide a pathway toward resolving previously inaccessible tissue structures.

Another approach to minimizing phase variance in interferometers involves the simultaneous estimation of multiple phases. Since the process of sample imaging is inherently a multiparameter estimation problem, further enhancements can be realized by exploiting this characteristic. The quantum probe that minimizes the phase variance for a single phase while reaching the Heisenberg limit is the N00N state: $|\psi\rangle = \frac{1}{\sqrt{2}} (|N,0\rangle + |0,N\rangle)$, a uniform superposition of $N$ particles passing entirely through either one of the two modes of the interferometer. Estimating $k$ independent phases using N00N states—allocating $N/k$ photons per phase—yields a total phase variance of $|\Delta\phi_{\text{single}}|^2 = \frac{k^3}{N^2}$. However, it has been theoretically shown that using a multiprobe interferometer, which distributes $N$ photons across $k+1$ modes (one reference and $k$ phase-encoding modes), can achieve a significantly lower optimal total variance of $|\Delta\phi_{\text{multi}}|^2 = \frac{(1 + \sqrt{k})^2 k}{4N^2}$. The resulting ratio of $\frac{|\Delta\phi_{\text{multi}}|^2}{|\Delta\phi_{\text{single}}|^2} = \frac{(1 + \sqrt{k})^2}{4k^2}$ becomes much smaller than 1 for $k > 4$, demonstrating a substantial quantum advantage.

While this technique does not explicitly rely on spin squeezing, it highlights that spin squeezing remains one of several powerful quantum resources for enabling sub-SQL performance in interferometry. However, practical implementation presents challenges, with a main one being the need to create a setup capable of initializing the optimal quantum states required to reduce phase variance. This reflects a broader challenge in quantum technologies: translating theoretical concepts into reliable physical systems. Despite this, there is growing experimental evidence supporting the integration of quantum technologies into measurement apparatuses, even without reaching the ultimate Heisenberg limit. As a result, the field of quantum metrology—and spin squeezing in particular—continues to be a vibrant and promising area of research.
