= Gaussian state =

Special class of quantum states

In quantum mechanics and quantum information theory, a Gaussian state (also called a quasi-free state in quantum field theory) is a specific type of mixed quantum state of either multiple bosons or multiple fermions.

== Bosonic Gaussian states ==
Gaussian states are named as such because, at least in the bosonic case, they behave like a quantum analog of the classical multivariate Gaussian distribution. A bosonic Gaussian state is uniquely determined by quantum analogs of the mean and covariance, which are equivalent to its one-point and two-point correlation functions. The Wigner quasiprobability distribution of a bosonic Gaussian state is always a classical multivariate Gaussian. For a single mode, a bosonic Gaussian state is the same as a squeezed coherent state, and general Gaussian states can be seen as a generalization of squeezed coherent states to multiple modes. The thermal state at any temperature of a Hamiltonian which is quadratic in the bosonic creation and annihilation operators is a bosonic Gaussian state, and this characterizes the class of bosonic Gaussian states.

== Fermionic Gaussian states ==
Gaussian states can also be defined in the fermionic setting. Similarly to the bosonic setting, the thermal state at any temperature of a Hamiltonian which is quadratic in the fermionic creation and annihilation operators is a fermionic Gaussian state, and any fermionic Gaussian state can be written in this way. A fermionic Gaussian state is in general determined by just its two-point correlation function, or covariance matrix.

== Geometric structure ==
In both the bosonic and fermionic cases, the set of Gaussian states which are pure has a rich geometric structure. Both can be equipped with natural Riemannian metrics which are in fact Kähler. They turn out to be the Hermitian symmetric spaces DIII_{n} in the bosonic case and CI_{n} in the fermionic space, using Cartan's classification. While this space is noncompact in the bosonic case, it is compact in the fermionic case and thus there is additional structure: it is also an algebraic variety, as can be shown using results from complex geometry such as the Kodaira embedding theorem and Serre's GAGA theorem.
