= Conditional quantum entropy =

Measure of relative information in quantum information theory

The conditional quantum entropy is an entropy measure used in quantum information theory. It is a generalization of the conditional entropy of classical information theory. For a bipartite state $\rho^{AB}$, the conditional entropy is written $S(A|B)_\rho$, or $H(A|B)_\rho$, depending on the notation being used for the von Neumann entropy. The quantum conditional entropy was defined in terms of a conditional density operator $\rho_{A|B}$ by Nicolas Cerf and Chris Adami, who showed that quantum conditional entropies can be negative, something that is forbidden in classical physics. The negativity of quantum conditional entropy is a sufficient criterion for quantum non-separability.

In what follows, we use the notation $S(\cdot)$ for the von Neumann entropy, which will simply be called "entropy".

== Definition ==
Given a bipartite quantum state $\rho^{AB}$, the entropy of the joint system AB is $S(AB)_\rho \ \stackrel{\mathrm{def}}{=}\ S(\rho^{AB})$, and the entropies of the subsystems are $S(A)_\rho \ \stackrel{\mathrm{def}}{=}\ S(\rho^A) = S(\mathrm{tr}_B\rho^{AB})$ and $S(B)_\rho$. The von Neumann entropy measures an observer's uncertainty about the value of the state, that is, how much the state is a mixed state.

By analogy with the classical conditional entropy, one defines the conditional quantum entropy as $S(A|B)_\rho \ \stackrel{\mathrm{def}}{=}\ S(AB)_\rho - S(B)_\rho$.

An equivalent operational definition of the quantum conditional entropy (as a measure of the quantum communication cost or surplus when performing quantum state merging) was given by Michał Horodecki, Jonathan Oppenheim, and Andreas Winter.

== Properties ==
Unlike the classical conditional entropy, the conditional quantum entropy can be negative. This is true even though the (quantum) von Neumann entropy of single variable is never negative. The negative conditional entropy is also known as the coherent information, and gives the additional number of bits above the classical limit that can be transmitted in a quantum dense coding protocol. Positive conditional entropy of a state thus means the state cannot reach even the classical limit, while the negative conditional entropy provides for additional information.
