= Paweł Horodecki =

Polish physicist

Paweł Horodecki (born 1971) is a Polish professor of physics at the Gdańsk University of Technology working in the field of quantum information theory.

He is best known for introducing (together with his father Ryszard Horodecki and brother Michał Horodecki) the Peres–Horodecki criterion for testing whether a quantum state is entangled. Moreover, Paweł Horodecki demonstrated that there exist states which are entangled whereas no pure entangled states can be obtained from them by means of local operations and classical communication (LOCC). Such states are called bound entangled states. He also showed that even bound entanglement (when used in conjunction with a single pair of free entangled particles) can lead to quantum teleportation with a fidelity impossible to achieve with only separable states.

Paweł Horodecki was educated in Poland, receiving an M.Sc from the University of Gdańsk (1995) and a Ph.D (with honours) from the Gdańsk University of Technology (1999) and a habilitation (with honours) from the University of Gdańsk (2004).
