= Nicolas J. Cerf =

Belgian physicist

Nicolas Cerf
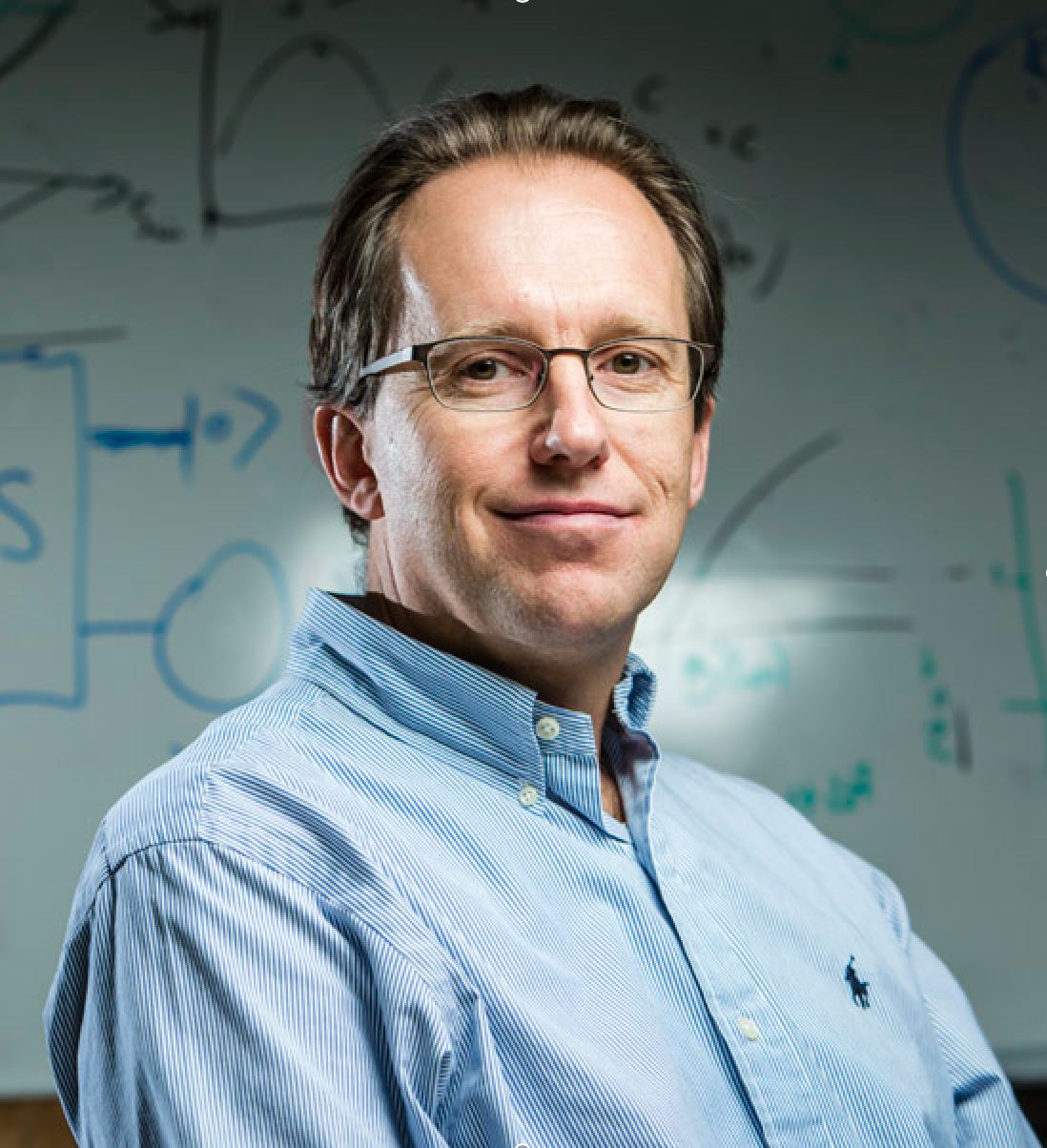
- Born: 1965 (age 60–61)
- Education: Université libre de Bruxelles
- Known for: Negative quantum entropy Quantum information with continuous variables
- Awards: Caltech President's Fund award (1997); Alcatel-Bell Science Prize (1999) Wernaers Prize of the FNRS (2000); Marie Curie Excellence Award (2006)
- Scientific career
- Fields: Physicist
- Workplaces: Paris-Sud 11 University; California Institute of Technology; Université libre de Bruxelles

Nicolas Jean Cerf (born 1965) is a Belgian physicist. He is a professor of quantum mechanics and information theory at the Université libre de Bruxelles and a member of the Royal Academies for Science and the Arts of Belgium. He received his Ph.D. at the Université libre de Bruxelles in 1993, and was a researcher at the Université de Paris 11 and the California Institute of Technology. He is the director of the Center for Quantum Information and Communication at the Université libre de Bruxelles.

== Research ==
Together with Christoph Adami, he defined the quantum version of conditional and mutual entropies, which are basic notions of Shannon's information theory, and discovered that quantum information could be negative (a pair of entangled particles was coined a qubit-antiqubit pair). This has led to important results in quantum information sciences, for example quantum state merging. He is best known today for his work on quantum information with continuous variables. He found a Gaussian quantum cloning transformation (see no-cloning theorem). He invented a Gaussian quantum key distribution protocol, which is the continuous counterpart of the so-called BB84 protocol, making a link with Shannon's theory of Gaussian channels. This has led to the first experimental demonstration of continuous-variable quantum key distribution with optical coherent states and homodyne detection.

== Honors ==
He received the Caltech President's Fund Award in 1997, and the Marie Curie Excellence Award in 2006.

== Works ==
- Cerf, Nicolas; Leuchs, G.; E. S. Polzik (2007). Quantum information with continuous variables of atoms and light. World Scientific. Bibcode:2007qicv.book.....C. doi:10.1142/p489. ISBN 978-1-86094-760-5.
