= Magdalena Marcinkowska =

Polish jurist

Magdalena Marcinkowska Ph.D.
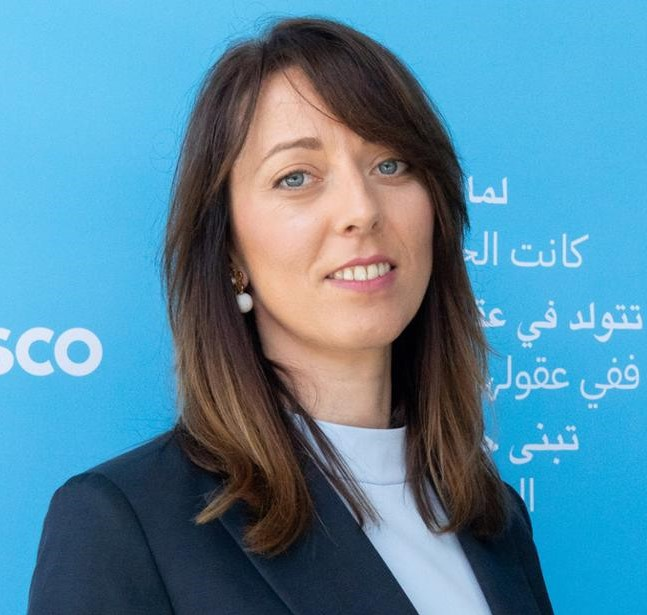

Poland Ambassador to UNESCO
- In office 2020–2022
- Preceded by: Krystyna Żurek
- Succeeded by: Mariusz Lewicki

Personal details
- Education: University of Gdańsk
- Profession: jurist

Magdalena Maria Marcinkowska is a Polish jurist who served as a permanent representative to UNESCO in Paris (2020–2022).

== Life ==
In 2016, she defended at the University of Gdańsk her doctoral thesis on the impact of the international law on cultural policy on Poland in the field of cultural heritage protection (doctoral advisor – Kamil Zeidler). As a researcher she specializes in legal mechanisms in managing cultural heritage on international and national levels, and their mutual interaction and cross-fertilisation.

She worked for the National Institute of Cultural Heritage of Poland, and as an assistant of the Deputy Minister of Culture and National Heritage and as a deputy director of the Monuments Protection Department of the Ministry of Culture and National Heritage of Poland.

In September 2020, she was appointed the Permanent Representative of Poland to UNESCO in Paris. She ended her term in 2022.

== Works ==
- Zeidler, Kamil; Marcinkowska, Magdalena (2017). Dekret Rady Regencyjnej z 1918 r. o opiece nad zabytkami sztuki i kultury z komentarzem, czyli eseje o prawie ochrony dziedzictwa kultury (in Polish). Gdańsk; Sopot: Wydawnictwo Uniwersytetu Gdańskiego. ISBN 978-83-7865-583-1.
