= Bound entanglement =

Weak form of quantum entanglement

Bound entanglement is a weak form of quantum entanglement, from which no singlets can be distilled with local operations and classical communication (LOCC).

Bound entanglement was discovered by M. Horodecki, P. Horodecki, and R. Horodecki. Bipartite entangled states that have a non-negative partial transpose are all bound-entangled. Moreover, a particular quantum state for 2x4 systems has been presented. Such states are not detected by the Peres–Horodecki criterion as entangled, thus other entanglement criteria are needed for their detection. There are a number of examples for such states.

There are also multipartite entangled states that have a negative partial transpose with respect to some bipartitions, while they have a positive partial transpose to the other partitions, nevertheless, they are undistillable.

The possible existence of bipartite bound entangled states with a negative partial transpose is still under intensive study.

== Properties of bound entangled states with a positive partial transpose ==
Bipartite bound entangled states do not exist in 2×2 or 2×3 systems, only in larger ones.

Rank-2 bound entangled states do not exist.

Bipartite bound entangled states with a positive partial transpose are useless for teleportation, as they cannot lead to a larger fidelity than the classical limit.

Bound entangled states with a positive partial transpose in 3×3 systems have a Schmidt number 2. The Schmidt number of bound entangled states has also been studied in larger systems.

It has been shown that bipartite bound entangled states with a positive partial transpose exist in symmetric systems. It has also been shown that in symmetric systems multipartite bound entangled states exists for which all partial transposes are non-negative.

Multiparticle bound entangled states arise in thermal states of well-known spin models, such as the antiferromegnatic Heisenberg chain of spin-1/2 particles. In these examples, all partial transposes are non-negative.

Asher Peres conjectured that bipartite bound entangled states with positive partial transpose cannot violate a Bell inequality. After a long search for counterexamples, the conjecture turned out to be false.

While no singlets can be distilled from bound entangled state, they can be still useful for some quantum information processing applications. Bound entanglement can be activated. Any entangled state can enhance the teleportation power of some other state. This holds even if the state is bound entangled. Bipartite entangled states with a non-negative partial transpose can be more useful for quantum metrology than separable states. Families of bound entangled states known analytically even for high dimension that outperform separable states for metrology. For large dimensions they approach asymptotically the maximal precision achievable by bipartite quantum states. There are bipartite bound entangled states that are not more useful than separable states, but if an auxiliary qubit is added to one of the subsystems then they outperform separable states in metrology.

== Properties of the set of states with a positive partial transpose ==
If we mix two quantum states with a positive partial transpose, then we obtain another state with a positive partial transpose. Thus, such states form a convex set, similarly to separable states. Extremal states states cannot be decomposed as the convex combination of other elements of the set. The properties of such states have been intensively studied, and some of them have been identified explicitly.

== See also ==
- Unextendible product basis
- Computable Cross Norm/Realignment (CCNR) Criterion
