= Westdeutsche Allgemeine Zeitung =

German newspaper

- Type: Daily newspaper
- Format: Berliner
- Owner: Funke Mediengruppe
- Founder: Erich Brost
- Publisher: Zeitungsverlag Ruhrgebiet GmbH & Co. KG
- Editor-in-chief: Andreas Tyrock
- Founded: 3 April 1948; 78 years ago
- Headquarters: Essen, North Rhine-Westphalia, Germany
- Website: www.waz.de

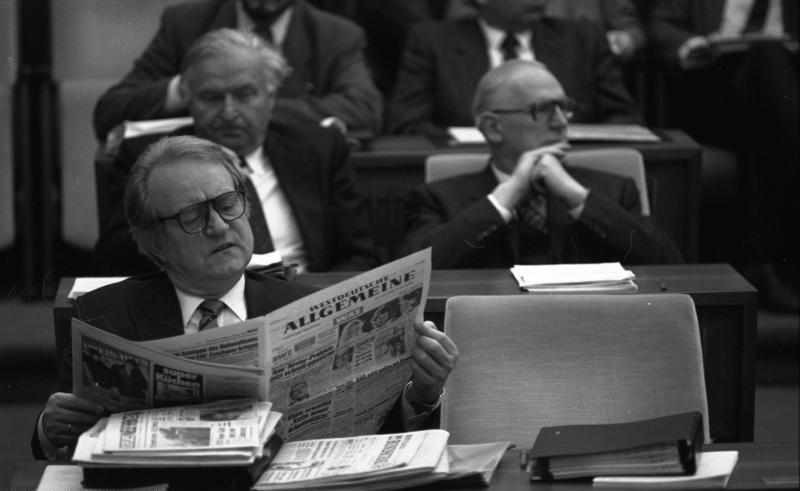
Johannes Rau reading the WAZ (1988)

The Westdeutsche Allgemeine Zeitung (WAZ; lit. 'West German General Newspaper') is a commercial newspaper from Essen, Germany, published by Funke Mediengruppe.

== History and profile ==
Westdeutsche Allgemeine Zeitung was founded by Erich Brost and Jakob Funke first published 3 April 1948. The paper has its headquarters in Essen. During the third quarter of 1992 Westdeutsche Allgemeine Zeitung had a circulation of 626,000 copies.

After the turn of the millennium, the WAZ came under economic pressure in the face of media change, so that several cost-cutting programs were adopted and editorial offices were closed. The last foreign offices were closed in 2013. In 2015, the local edition in Lünen, whose local content had previously no longer been produced in-house but supplied by Ruhr Nachrichten, was discontinued. WAZ's editorial independence was also gradually reduced: national reporting was outsourced to a Funke central editorial office in Berlin in 2015, while a Funke-wide "competence center" for sports was established in Essen in 2016.

At the same time, the publishing house invested in digital content: In 2007, the online portal DerWesten.de went online, which bundled all of the WAZ Group's editorial reporting in North Rhine-Westphalia on one platform. However, this strategy was abandoned in 2012. While DerWesten was transformed into a tabloid site, the digital content of the WAZ editorial offices has since been published on waz.de again.

In 2019, the WAZ central editorial office and the local editorial office in Essen moved to the Funke Media Group's new media building and the former publishing house was demolished.

As part of a cost-cutting program, the printing plant in Essen was closed in 2021; since then, all WAZ editions have been produced at the Funke printing center in Hagen-Bathey.

== Editors-in-chief ==
- 1948–1970: Erich Brost
- 1970–1988: Siegfried Maruhn
- 1988–2000: Ralf Lehmann
- 2000–2005: Uwe Knüpfer
- 2005–2014: Ulrich Reitz
- since 2014: Andreas Tyrock

== See also ==
- List of newspapers in Germany
