= Jerzy Samp =

Polish writer, publicist and historian

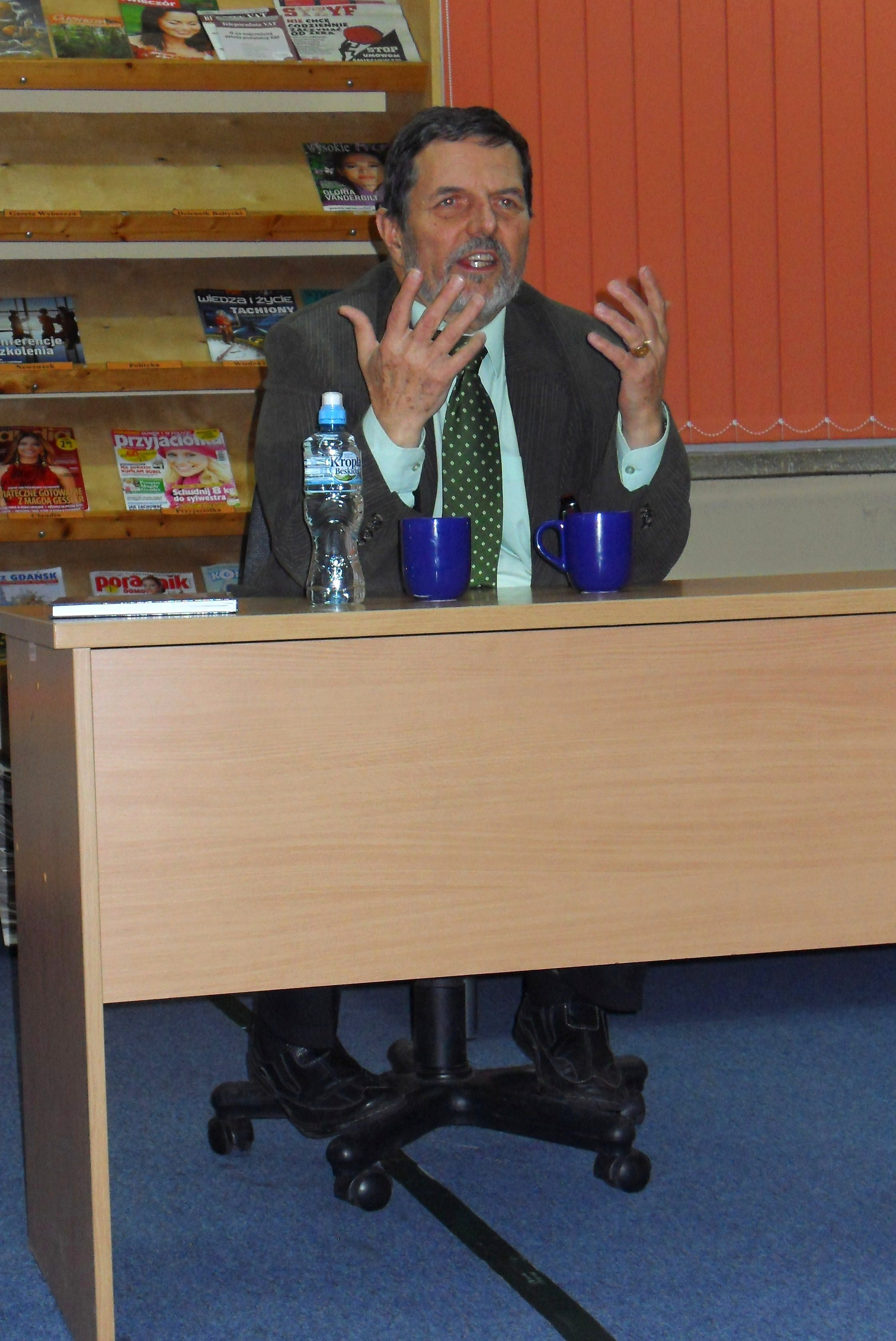
Jerzy Samp

Jerzy Samp (23 March 1951 in Gdańsk – 16 February 2015) was a Polish writer, publicist and historian of the literature and culture of Pomerania and especially of the Kashubian literature. He was also an activist in the Kashubian-Pomeranian Association (chairman of Gdańsk Branch 1986–1989, 1995–1998).

Born Gdańsk, Poland, he studied Polish philology in the University of Gdańsk graduating in 1975, received a doctorate in 1982, doctor habilitowany title in 1992 and the title of professor in 1995. Since 1975 he has worked in Gdańsk University in the department of the History of Literature and Culture of 19th and 20th century Pomerania. He was also a member of the Gdańsk Scientific Society (Gdańskie Towarzystwo Naukowe), the Folklore Commission of the Polish Literature Commission of the Polish Academy of Sciences (Polska Akademia Nauk), the Kashubian Institute (Instytut Kaszubski), and Polish Writers Associations (Stowarzyszenie Pisarzy Polskich).

== Publications ==
- Cyrografy (1977)
- Smętek. Studium kreacji literackich (1984)
- Baśniokrąg pomorski w pisarstwie Lecha Bądkowskiego (1984)
- Motywy skandynawskie w tradycji, kulturze i piśmiennictwie kaszubsko-pomorskim (1988)
- Poezja rodnej mowy (1985)
- Zaklęta stegna. Bajki kaszubskie (1985)
- Gdańsk w relacjach z podróży 1772–1918 (1991)
- Z woli morza. Bałtyckie mitopeje
- Gdańsk. Przewodnik po mieście (1991)
- Orunia, Zabytkim historia, kultura (1992)
- Wrzeszcz. Kościół na Czarnej (1992)
- Legendy gdańskie. Baśnie, podania i przypowieści (1992)
- Bedeker gdański (1994)
- Uczta stulecia. Dawne i nowe legendy gdańskie (1994)
- Przygoda Królewianki i inne bajki z Kaszub (1994)
- Miasto czterdziestu bram. Gdańskie mitopeje (1996)

== Awards ==
- Medal Stolema (1985)
