= Reinhard F. Werner =

German physicist

- Born: 26th March 1954 (age 72); Kassel
- Education: Clausthal University of Technology; Marburg University
- Known for: Quantum cellular automaton Quantum information theory Tensor network Werner state
- Awards: ERC Advanced Grant (2011); International Quantum Communication Award (2014); Max Planck Medal (2025)
- Scientific career
- Fields: Physics
- Workplaces: Leibniz University Hannover
- Doctoral advisor: Gunther Ludwig

Reinhard F. Werner (born 26th march 1954) is a German physicist, and Professor at the Institute of Theoretical Physics at the Leibniz Universität Hannover.

He is notable for his contributions to the field of quantum information theory such as foundational concepts in the theory of quantum correlations including the concept of separable quantum states and mixed entangled states now known as Werner state, finitely correlated states aka matrix product states, mean field theory and entanglement area laws.

== Education ==
After studies from 1970 - 1982 at the universities of Clausthal, Marburg and Rochester he obtained his Diploma in 1976 and his Doctorate 1982 in physics from the Philipps-Universität Marburg, where he worked with Günther Ludwig.

== Career ==
After finishing his doctorate he was working at the Physics Department of the University of Osnabrück where he also completed his Habilitation in 1987. In 1988/89 he held a Feodor Lynen Fellowship of the Alexander von Humboldt Foundation at the Dublin Institute for Advanced Studies where he stayed until 1990. He also held a Heisenberg Fellowship of the German Research Council from 1989 - 1995. In April 1997 he accepted a Professorship at the Institute of Mathematical Physics of the Technische Universität Braunschweig which he held until 2009. After declining an offer of the Leigh Trapnell Chair of Quantum Physics at DAMTP of Cambridge University in 2009 he moved to the Leibniz Universität Hannover where he is still working.

== See also ==
- Bipartite quantum states
