= W. G. Unruh =

Canadian physicist

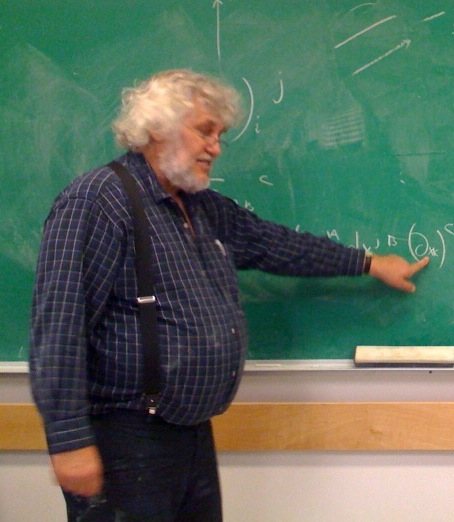
- Unruh teaching "PHYS 407 - Introduction to General Relativity" at University of British Columbia (December 2008)
- Born: William George Unruh; 28 August 1945 (age 81); Winnipeg, Manitoba, Canada
- Education: University of Manitoba (B.Sc.); Princeton University (M.A., Ph.D.)
- Known for: Unruh effect Sonic black hole
- Awards: Rutherford Memorial Medal (1982); Herzberg Medal (1983); Steacie Prize (1984); E.W.R. Steacie Memorial Fellowship (1984–1986); BC Science Council Gold Medal (1990); Royal Society Fellowship (2001)
- Scientific career
- Fields: Theoretical physics General Relativity; Quantum Mechanics
- Workplaces: University of British Columbia
- Doctoral advisor: John Archibald Wheeler
- Doctoral students: Jonathan Oppenheim

William George Unruh (/ˈʌnruː/; born August 28, 1945) is a Canadian physicist at the University of British Columbia, Vancouver who described the hypothetical Unruh effect in 1976.

== Early life and education ==
Unruh was born into a Mennonite family in Winnipeg, Manitoba. His parents were Benjamin Unruh, a refugee from Russia, and Anna Janzen, who was born in Canada. He obtained his B.Sc. from the University of Manitoba in 1967, followed by an M.A. (1969) and Ph.D. (1971) from Princeton University, New Jersey, under the direction of John Archibald Wheeler.

== Areas of research ==
Unruh has made seminal contributions to our understanding of gravity, black holes, cosmology, and quantum fields in curved spaces, including hypothesizing of what is now known as the Unruh effect. Unruh has contributed to the foundations of quantum mechanics in areas such as decoherence and the question of time in quantum mechanics. He has helped to clarify the meaning of nonlocality in a quantum context, in particular that quantum nonlocality does not follow from Bell's theorem and that ultimately quantum mechanics is a local theory. Unruh is also one of the main critics of the Afshar experiment.

Unruh is also interested in music and teaches the Physics of Music.

=== Unruh effect ===
The Unruh effect, described by Unruh in 1976, is the prediction that an accelerating observer will observe black-body radiation where an inertial observer would observe none. In other words, the accelerating observer will find itself in a warm background, the temperature of which is proportional to the acceleration. The same quantum state of a field, which is taken to be the ground state for observers in inertial systems, is seen as a thermal state for the uniformly accelerated observer. The Unruh effect therefore means that the very notion of the quantum vacuum depends on the path of the observer through spacetime.

The Unruh effect can be expressed in a simple equation giving the equivalent energy kT of a uniformly accelerating particle (with a being the constant acceleration), as:

$$kT = \frac{\hbar a}{2\pi c}$$
