= Erich Brost =

German journalist (1903–1995)

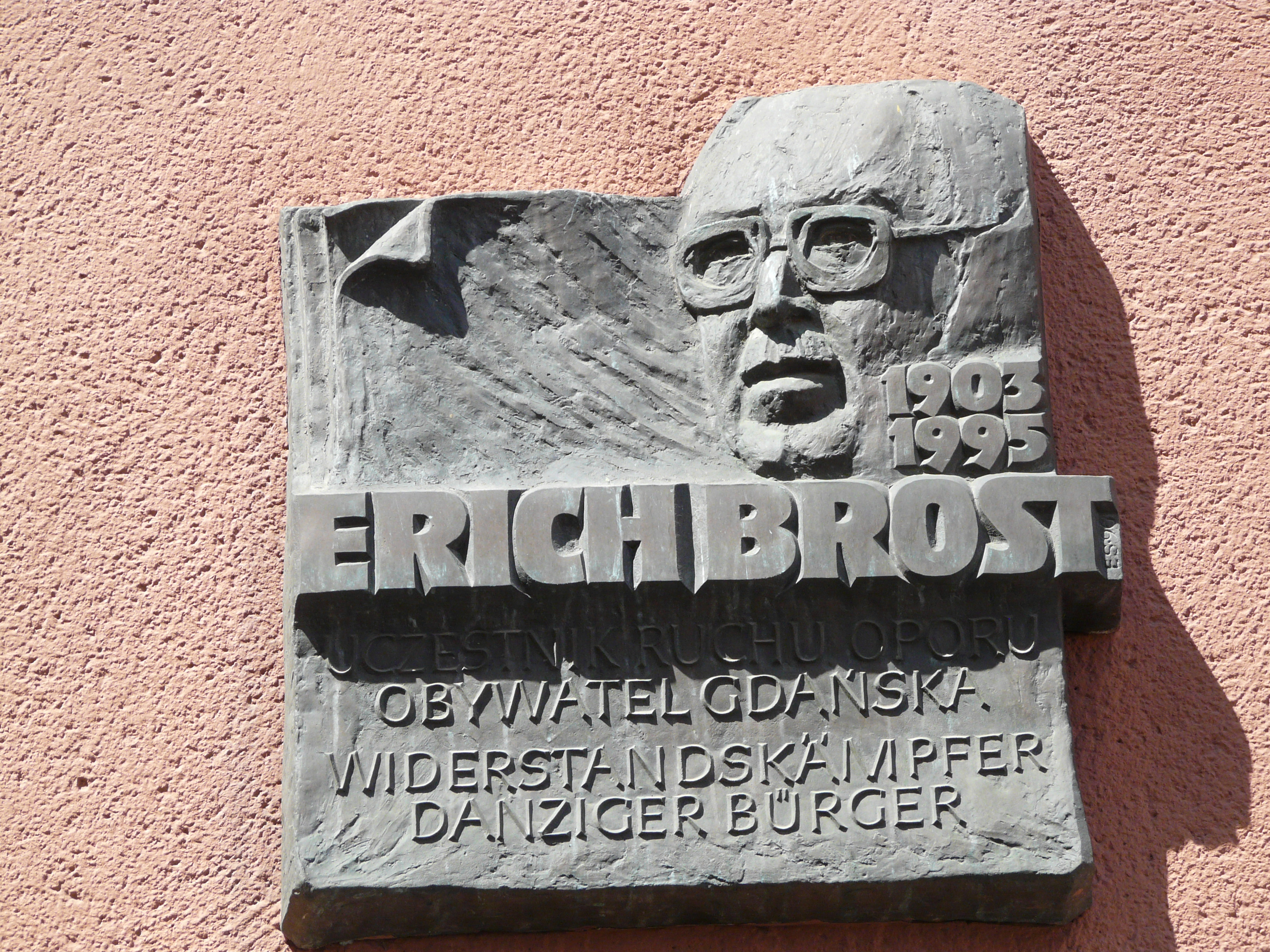
A plaque dedicated to Erich Brost in Gdańsk

Erich Brost (29 October 1903 – 8 October 1995) was a German journalist and publisher.

== Biography ==
Brost was born in Elbing, West Prussia to a Schichau-Werke shipyard worker and a tailor. In 1915 his family moved to Danzig (modern Gdańsk, Poland), where he became a bookseller and engaged in politics and the labour movement.

Aged 19 Brost wrote his first column for the Social democratic Danziger Volksstimme, for which he worked until 1936, when the Volksstimme got suspended and the Social Democratic Party of the Free City of Danzig was forbidden. In 1935 he became a member of the Volkstag, the Free City of Danzig's parliament, representing the SPD. Brost went into exile to Poland, Sweden, Finland and Great Britain, where he worked for the BBC. After World War II and the expulsion of the German populace Brost moved to the Ruhr area in 1945 to build up the German News Service, a predecessor of the Deutsche Presse-Agentur (dpa). Brost was active in the Social Democratic Party of Germany and represented the party at the Allied Control Council. He received an Allied licence to publish a newspaper in the British Zone of occupied Germany. The first copy of the Westdeutsche Allgemeine Zeitung (WAZ) was published on 3 April 1948 and Brost influenced the WAZ for the next decades.

Brost founded the Erich-Brost-Stiftung in 1991, the "Erich Brost University Lecturership" at the University of Oxford's "Institute of European and Comparative Law" is dedicated to him.

== Erich-Brost-Danzig-Award ==
Brost donated the Erich-Brost-Danzig-Preis of 20,000 Euro, which is awarded to people or institutions for their merits in Polish-German reconciliation.

It was awarded to:

- 1996: Kashubian-Pomeranian Association
- 1997: Stefan Chwin, author
- 1998: Szczepan Baum and Ryszard Semka, Architects
- 1999: "Forschungsstelle Osteuropa" at the University of Bremen
- 2001: Cultural Association "Borussia", Olsztyn
- 2003: the twin towns of Bremen and Gdańsk
