= Stefan Chwin =

Polish novelist, literary critic, and historian

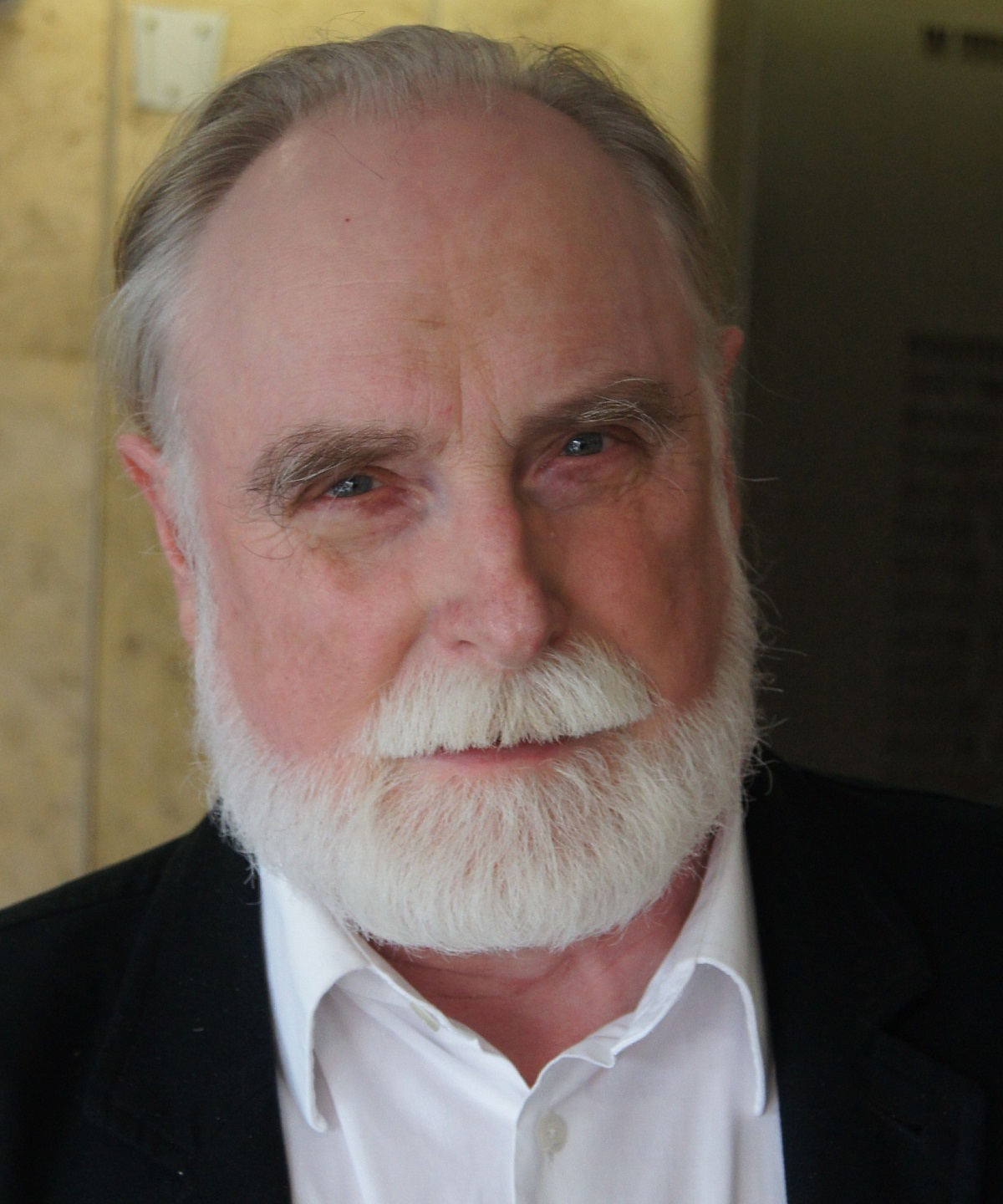
- Stefan Chwin (2018)
- Born: 11 April 1949 (age 77); Gdańsk, Poland
- Occupation: writer
- Writing career
- Pen name: Max Lars

Stefan Chwin (born 11 April 1949 in Gdańsk) is a Polish novelist, literary critic, and historian of literature whose life and literary work is closely linked to his hometown. He holds a post of Literature Professor at the University of Gdansk, his professional interests are focused on romanticism.

The best-known novel by Stefan Chwin is entitled Hanemann (1995). It has been translated into German, Swedish, Spanish and English; the plot of the novel is set in Gdańsk in the wake of World War II.

In 1995, he won the Paszport Polityki Award in literature. In 1997 he received the "Erich Brost Danzig Award" for his merits on Polish-German reconciliation.
