= Werner state =

Quantum state

A Werner state is a $d^2$ × $d^2$-dimensional bipartite quantum state density matrix that is invariant under all unitary operators of the form $U \otimes U$. That is, it is a bipartite quantum state $\rho_{AB}$ that satisfies

$$\rho_{AB} = (U \otimes U) \rho_{AB} (U^\dagger \otimes U^\dagger)$$

for all unitary operators U acting on d-dimensional Hilbert space. These states were first developed by Reinhard F. Werner in 1989.

== General definition ==
Every Werner state $W_{AB}^{(p,d)}$ is a mixture of projectors onto the symmetric and antisymmetric subspaces, with the relative weight $p \in [0,1]$ being the main parameter that defines the state, in addition to the dimension $d \geq 2$:

$$W_{AB}^{(p,d)} = p \frac{2}{d(d+1)} P^\text{sym}_{AB} + (1-p) \frac{2}{d(d-1)} P^\text{as}_{AB},$$

where

$$P^\text{sym}_{AB} = \frac{1}{2}(I_{AB}+F_{AB}),$$
$$P^\text{as}_{AB} = \frac{1}{2}(I_{AB}-F_{AB}),$$

are the projectors and

$$F_{AB} = \sum_{ij} |i\rangle \langle j|_A \otimes |j\rangle \langle i|_B$$

is the permutation or flip operator that exchanges the two subsystems A and B.

Werner states are separable for p ≥ 1/2 and entangled for p < 1/2. All entangled Werner states violate the PPT separability criterion, but for d ≥ 3 no Werner state violates the weaker reduction criterion. Werner states can be parametrized in different ways. One way of writing them is

$$\rho_{AB} = \frac{1}{d^2-d \alpha}(I_{AB} - \alpha F_{AB}),$$

where the new parameter α varies between −1 and 1 and relates to p as

$$\alpha = ((1-2p)d+1)/(1-2p+d) .$$

== Two-qubit example ==
Two-qubit Werner states, corresponding to $d=2$ above, can be written explicitly in matrix form as
$$W_{AB}^{(p,2)} = \frac{p}{6} \begin{pmatrix}2 & 0 & 0 & 0 \\ 0&1 & 1 &0 \\0&1&1&0\\0&0&0&2\end{pmatrix}
+ \frac{(1-p)}{2}
\begin{pmatrix}0 & 0 & 0 & 0 \\ 0&1 & -1 &0 \\0&-1&1&0\\0&0&0&0\end{pmatrix}
= \begin{pmatrix}
\frac{p}{3} & 0 & 0 & 0 \\
0 & \frac{3-2p}{6} & \frac{-3+4p}{6} & 0 \\
0 & \frac{-3+4p}{6} & \frac{3-2p}{6} & 0\\
0 & 0 & 0 & \frac{p}{3}
\end{pmatrix}.$$
Equivalently, these can be written as a convex combination of the totally mixed state with (the projection onto) a Bell state:
$$W_{AB}^{(\lambda,2)} =
\lambda |\Psi^-\rangle\!\langle\Psi^-| + \frac{1-\lambda}{4}I_{AB},
\qquad |\Psi^-\rangle\equiv \frac{1}{\sqrt2}(|01\rangle-|10\rangle),$$
where $\lambda\in[-1/3,1]$ (or, confining oneself to positive values, $\lambda\in[0,1]$) is related to $p$ by $\lambda=(3-4p)/3$. Then, two-qubit Werner states are separable for $\lambda \leq 1/3$ and entangled for $\lambda > 1/3$.

== Werner-Holevo channels ==
A Werner-Holevo quantum channel $\mathcal{W}_{A\rightarrow B}^{\left( p,d\right) }$ with parameters $p\in\left[ 0,1\right]$ and integer $d\geq2$ is defined as

$$\mathcal{W}_{A\rightarrow B}^{\left(  p,d\right)  } = p
\mathcal{W}_{A\rightarrow B}^{\text{sym}  }+\left(  1-p\right)\mathcal{W}_{A\rightarrow
B}^{\text{as}  },$$

where the quantum channels $\mathcal{W}_{A\rightarrow B}^{\text{sym} }$ and $\mathcal{W}_{A\rightarrow B}^{\text{as} }$ are defined as

$$\mathcal{W}_{A\rightarrow B}^{\text{sym}  }(X_{A})   =
\frac{1}{d+1}\left[\operatorname{Tr}[X_{A}]I_{B}+\operatorname{id}_{A\rightarrow B}
(T_{A}(X_{A}))\right],$$
$$\mathcal{W}_{A\rightarrow B}^{\text{as}  }(X_{A})   =
\frac{1}{d-1}\left[\operatorname{Tr}[X_{A}]I_{B}-\operatorname{id}_{A\rightarrow B}
(T_{A}(X_{A}))\right],$$

and $T_{A}$ denotes the partial transpose map on system A. Note that the Choi state of the Werner-Holevo channel $\mathcal{W}_{A\rightarrow B}^{p,d}$ is a Werner state:

$$\mathcal{W}_{A\rightarrow B}^{\left(  p,d\right)  }(\Phi_{RA})=p  \frac{2}{d\left(  d+1\right)  }P_{RB}^{\text{sym}}+
\left(
1-p\right)\frac{2}{d\left(  d-1\right)  }P_{RB}^{\text{as}},$$

where $\Phi_{RA} = \frac{1}{d} \sum_{i,j} |i\rangle \langle j|_R \otimes |i\rangle \langle j|_A$.

== Multipartite Werner states ==
Werner states can be generalized to the multipartite case. An N-party Werner state is a state that is invariant under $U \otimes U \otimes \cdots \otimes U$ for any unitary U on a single subsystem. The Werner state is no longer described by a single parameter, but by N! − 1 parameters, and is a linear combination of the N! different permutations on N systems.
