= Michał Horodecki =

Polish physicist

Michał Horodecki (born 1973) is a Polish physicist at the University of Gdańsk working in the field of quantum information theory, notable for his work on entanglement theory.

He co-discovered the Peres–Horodecki criterion for testing whether a state is entangled, and used it to find bound entanglement together with his brother Paweł Horodecki and father Ryszard Horodecki. He co-discovered with Jonathan Oppenheim, Paweł Horodecki and Karol Horodecki that secret key can be drawn from some bound entangled states. Together with Fernando Brandao he proved that every one-dimensional quantum state with a finite correlation length obeys an area law for entanglement entropy. Together with Oppenheim and Andreas Winter, he discovered quantum state-merging and used this primitive to show that quantum information could be negative.

2015 he was awarded the Minister of Science and Higher Education Awards of the Polish government.

== Papers ==
- Horodecki, Michał; Oppenheim, Jonathan; Winter, Andreas (2005). "Partial Quantum Information". Nature. 436 (7051): 673–676. arXiv:quant-ph/0505062. Bibcode:2005Natur.436..673H. doi:10.1038/nature03909. PMID 16079840. S2CID 4413693.
