= Ryszard Horodecki =

Polish physicist

- Born: 30 September 1943 (age 82); Kovel, Ukraine
- Citizenship: Polish
- Education: University of Gdańsk
- Known for: Peres–Horodecki criterion bound entanglement
- Scientific career
- Fields: Quantum informatics, Theoretical physics

Ryszard Horodecki (born 30 September 1943) is a Polish physicist and a professor of University of Gdańsk. He contributed largely to the field of quantum informatics. In his most widely cited paper, 'Separability of Mixed States: Necessary and Sufficient Conditions' written together with his sons, Michał and Paweł, he proposed the idea currently known as the Peres–Horodecki criterion. With over 12,000 citations, he is considered to be one of the leading Polish physicists.

== Career ==
He graduated from Department of Electronics, University of Gdańsk. Horodecki received his Ph.D. from Gdańsk University of Technology in 1976. Twenty-one years later, in 1997 he obtained his habilitation from Nicolaus Copernicus University in Toruń. His contribution to the quantum informatics were acknowledged in 2008, when he received the Prize of the Foundation for Polish Science in the field of mathematics and physics. In 2010 he became a member of Polish Academy of Sciences, whereas in 2011 received prestigious ERC Advanced Grant.

Beyond scientific work, Horodecki publishes also poems in several Polish newspapers, particularly in Tygodnik Powszechny.

== Personal life ==
Horodecki's sons, Michał, Paweł, and Karol are also physicists working in Gdańsk with all of whom he jointly published the review article "Quantum entanglement".

== Honours and awards ==
- Prize of the Foundation for Polish Science (2008)
- European Research Council Advanced Grant (2011)

== Most influential publications ==
1. Horodecki M., Horodecki P., Horodecki R., (1996) Separability of Mixed States: Necessary and Sufficient Conditions, Physics Letters A
