= Izabela Dłużyk =

Polish nature sound recordist

- Born: 1989 (age 36–37); Gdańsk, Poland
- Education: University of Gdańsk
- Occupation: nature sound recordist
- Awards: 100 Women (BBC) (2023)

Izabela Dłużyk (Polish: [ˈdwuʐɨk]; born 1989 in Gdańsk) is a Polish nature sound recordist and a graduate in English and Russian studies from the University of Gdańsk. She has recorded many birds including cranes in the Warta Mouth, cormorants on the Vistula Spit, geese in the Beka reserve, whooper swans in the Słupia Valley and storks in Żywków on the border with Russia among the many others. She was named to BBC 100 Women list in November 2023.

== Biography ==
Born blind, Dłużyk developed interest in birds, particularly parrots. She began recording bird noises at the age of 12 after getting a cassette recorder from family. Dłużyk has developed a specific sensitivity to birdsong since getting the cassette recorder from her family. Because of this, she can identify species solely based on its sound. Among her credits are an album made in collaboration with the Australian firm Listening Earth including sounds from the Białowieża Forest. She began her quest by recording birds and their sounds.

In September 2023, BBC World broadcast a documentary about Dłużyk titled Isabela in the forest. We, humans, focus more on visual aspects. "When observing birds, we mainly think about photography. For example, we identify species based on their appearance rather than their sounds. When I listen not only to birds, but also to trees, I simply feel in the right place, with a sense of the deepest meaning of existence; she admits. Dłużyk is a graduate of English and Russian studies. On a daily basis, she works at the Foreign Language Center of the University of Gdańsk as a translator. In November 2023, Dłużyk was included to the BBC 100 Women list. She was the only Polish woman to be included to the list.
