= Andrzej Butkiewicz =

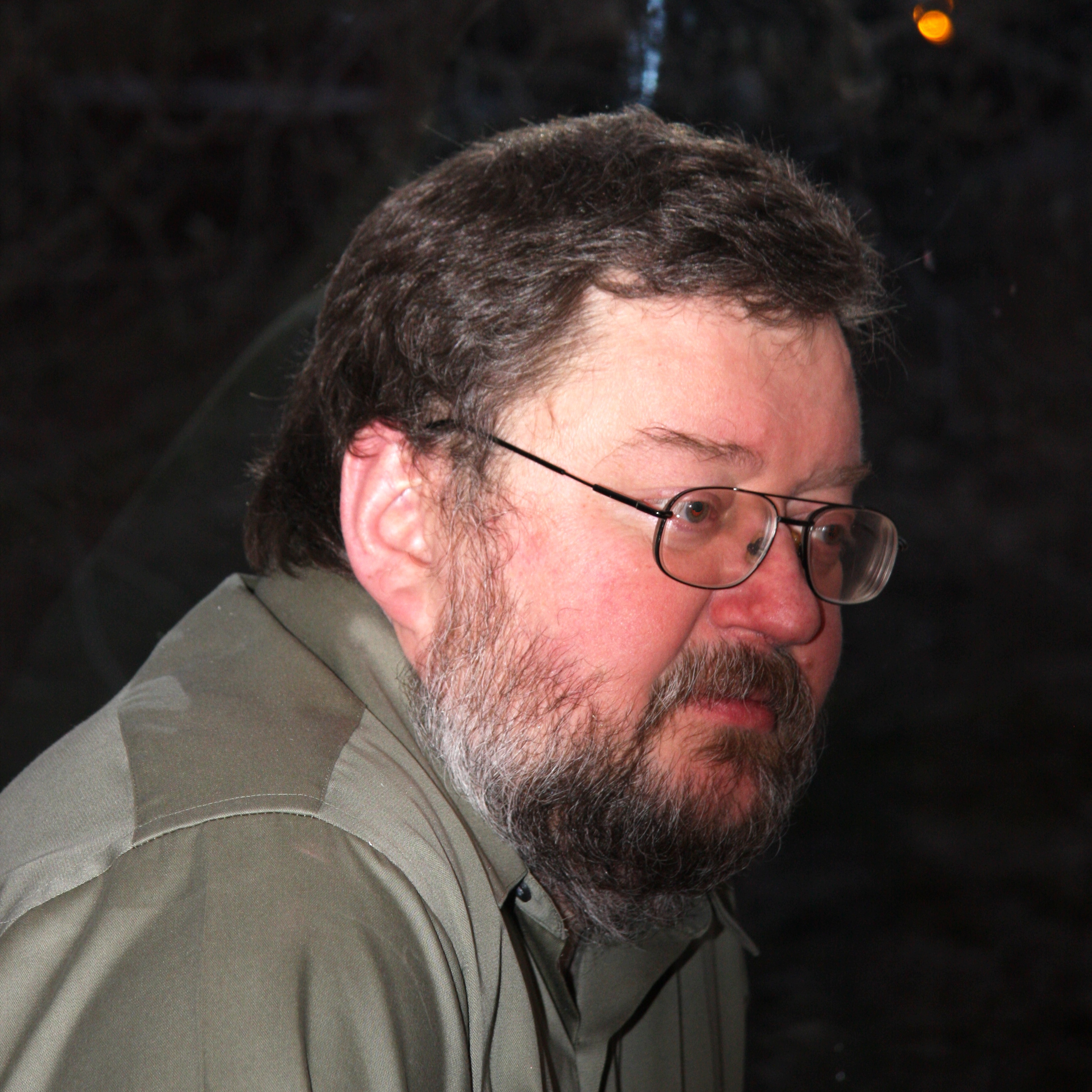
- 16 February 2008
- Born: 30 June 1955; Poland
- Died: 7 March 2008 (age 53); Norton, Massachusetts, US
- Education: University of Gdansk
- Occupation: Political activist
- Years active: 1977–1981
- Known for: Democratic opposition leader in communist Poland; leader in the Solidarity movement
- Title: Knight's Cross of the Order of Rebirth of Poland (posthumous)
- Movement: Solidarity
- Children: 3

Andrzej Butkiewicz (1955 – 7 March 2008) was a political activist opposing Communism in Poland during the 1970s and 1980s, imprisoned for his role in the Solidarity movement.

== Biography ==
In 1977, as a student of economy at the University of Gdańsk, Butkiewicz co-founded the Student Committee of Solidarity (Polish: Studencki Komitet Solidarności), a student organization opposing the Communist regime. His activities led to his expulsion from the university. Despite political pressure from the secret police, Butkiewicz continued his activism.

He was active in distributing underground news and literature and held underground meetings and classes of the "Flying University" at his apartment in Gdańsk. During this period, he was interrogated and arrested several times by the police. In March 1980, he lost his job at the Gdańsk port because of his anti-government activities.

During the strikes in August 1980, Butkiewicz headed the printing office in the Gdynia Shipyard. The flyers and press releases from that printing office kept Gdańsk and the whole nation informed about the goals of the strike and its progress. These strikes were the birth of the independent trade union Solidarity. Butkiewicz was an active organizer and head of the union's printing office. He worked with trade unions from the West to establish free press offices throughout Poland.

On 13 December 1981, martial law was declared by the Communist authorities in Poland; Butkiewicz, along with other Solidarity activists, was imprisoned. Butkiewicz's cellmate, Lech Kaczyński, later became President of Poland. When Butkiewicz was released from prison in 1982, he was forced to leave Poland with his wife and two young children; his third child was born in Boston. He settled in the Boston area, working in printing, and raised his family, but never cut off his ties with Poland.

Andrzej died of a heart attack at his home in Norton, Massachusetts on Friday, March 7, 2008. He was 53. On 9 March 2008, President of Poland Lech Kaczyński posthumously awarded Butkiewicz the Knight's Cross of the Order of Rebirth of Poland.
