= Jonathan Oppenheim =

British scientist

- Born: 1970 (age 55–56); Cape Town, South Africa
- Education: University of Toronto (BSc, 1993); University of British Columbia (PhD, 2000)
- Awards: Royal Society Wolfson Research Merit Award; EPSRC Established Career Fellowship
- Scientific career
- Fields: quantum information theory quantum gravity
- Workplaces: University College London; University of Cambridge; Racah Institute of Physics, The Hebrew University; University of Alberta
- Thesis: Quantum Time (2000)
- Doctoral advisor: Bill Unruh
- Website: www.ucl.ac.uk/oppenheim/

Jonathan Oppenheim is a professor of physics at University College London. He is an expert in quantum information theory and quantum gravity.

== Life ==
Oppenheim obtained a bachelor's degree at the University of Toronto in 1993 and PhD at the University of British Columbia in 2001. His PhD thesis titled Quantum Time, focused on time ordering in quantum mechanics and was supervised by Bill Unruh.

In 2004, he was a postdoctoral researcher under Jacob Bekenstein and a Royal Society University Fellow at the University of Cambridge before moving to University College London.

In 2005, together with Michał Horodecki and Andreas Winter, Oppenheim discovered quantum state-merging and used this primitive to show that quantum information could be negative. Following on this work, Oppenheim and collaborators have developed a resource theory for thermodynamics on the nano and quantum scale.

In 2017, Oppenheim and Lluis Masanes derived the third law of thermodynamics using quantum information arguments and set a bound to the speed at which information can be erased.

Oppenheim published a proposal in 2023 for a hybrid theory that couples classical general relativity with quantum field theory. According to this proposal, spacetime is not quantized but smooth and continuous, and is subject to random fluctuations.

== Edible ballot society ==
As a student, Oppenheim was involved in the Edible Ballot Society which satirically advanced eating ballots to highlight the democracy gap in electoral politics. He was arrested at the 1997 APEC protests on University of British Columbia campus. He withdrew from the Commission for Public Complaints Against the RCMP following the refusal of the Prime Minister to testify. His group was responsible for smuggling a siege catapult into the medieval city of Quebec during the Summit of Americas, 2001. It was used to lob teddy bears.

== Selected publications ==
- Oppenheim, Jonathan; Horodecki, Michał; Horodecki, Paweł; Horodecki, Ryszard (11 October 2002). "Thermodynamical Approach to Quantifying Quantum Correlations". Physical Review Letters. 89 (18). arXiv:quant-ph/0112074. doi:10.1103/PhysRevLett.89.180402.
- Horodecki, Michał; Oppenheim, Jonathan; Winter, Andreas (August 2005). "Partial quantum information". Nature. 436 (7051): 673–676. arXiv:quant-ph/0505062. doi:10.1038/nature03909.
- Oppenheim, Jonathan (24 February 2006). "Implementing a Quantum Computation by Free Falling" (PDF). Science. 311 (5764): 1106–1107. doi:10.1126/science.1124295.
- Oppenheim, Jonathan; Wehner, Stephanie (19 November 2010). "The Uncertainty Principle Determines the Nonlocality of Quantum Mechanics". Science. 330 (6007): 1072–1074. arXiv:1004.2507. doi:10.1126/science.1192065.
- Horodecki, Michał; Oppenheim, Jonathan (26 June 2013). "Fundamental limitations for quantum and nanoscale thermodynamics". Nature Communications. 4 (1). arXiv:1111.3834. doi:10.1038/ncomms3059.
- Brandão, Fernando G. S. L.; Horodecki, Michał; Oppenheim, Jonathan; Renes, Joseph M.; Spekkens, Robert W. (18 December 2013). "Resource Theory of Quantum States Out of Thermal Equilibrium". Physical Review Letters. 111 (25). arXiv:1111.3882. doi:10.1103/PhysRevLett.111.250404.
- Brandão, Fernando; Horodecki, Michał; Ng, Nelly; Oppenheim, Jonathan; Wehner, Stephanie (17 March 2015). "The second laws of quantum thermodynamics". Proceedings of the National Academy of Sciences. 112 (11): 3275–3279. arXiv:1305.5278. doi:10.1073/pnas.1411728112.
- Masanes, Lluís; Oppenheim, Jonathan (14 March 2017). "A general derivation and quantification of the third law of thermodynamics". Nature Communications. 8 (1). arXiv:1412.3828. doi:10.1038/ncomms14538.
- Oppenheim, Jonathan (4 December 2023). "A Postquantum Theory of Classical Gravity?". Physical Review X. 13 (4). arXiv:1811.03116. doi:10.1103/PhysRevX.13.041040.
