= Andreas Winter =

German mathematician

Andreas J. Winter (born 14 June 1971, Mühldorf, Germany) is a German mathematician and mathematical physicist at the Universitat Autònoma de Barcelona (UAB) in Spain. He received his Ph.D. in 1999 under Rudolf Ahlswede and Friedrich Götze at Bielefeld University in Germany before moving to the University of Bristol and then to the Centre for Quantum Technologies (CQT) at the National University of Singapore. In 2013 he was appointed ICREA Research Professor at UAB.

Winter's research is focused in the field of quantum information theory. Some of his main contributions concern the understanding of quantum communication protocols, the coding theory for quantum channels, and the theory of quantum entanglement. Together with Michał Horodecki and Jonathan Oppenheim, he discovered quantum state-merging and used this primitive to show that quantum information could be negative. Together with Marcin Pawlowski, Tomasz Paterek, Dagomir Kaszlikowski, and Valerio Scarani, he discovered information causality. Together with Runyao Duan and Simone Severini, he introduced a quantum mechanical version of the Lovász number. Together with Sandu Popescu, Noah Linden and Tony Short he proved that local equilibration of large quantum systems is a generic phenomena.

He was awarded the Philip Leverhulme Prize for Mathematics and Statistics in 2008 and in 2012 the Whitehead Prize of the London Mathematical Society.

== Papers ==
- Horodecki, Michał; Oppenheim, Jonathan; Winter, Andreas (2005). "Partial quantum information". Nature. 436 (7051). Springer Science and Business Media LLC: 673–676. arXiv:quant-ph/0505062. Bibcode:2005Natur.436..673H. doi:10.1038/nature03909. ISSN 0028-0836. PMID 16079840. S2CID 119075934.
- Pawłowski, Marcin; Paterek, Tomasz; Kaszlikowski, Dagomir; Scarani, Valerio; Winter, Andreas; Żukowski, Marek (2009). "Information causality as a physical principle". Nature. 461 (7267): 1101–1104. arXiv:0905.2292. Bibcode:2009Natur.461.1101P. doi:10.1038/nature08400. ISSN 0028-0836. PMID 19847260. S2CID 4428663.
- Duan, Runyao; Severini, Simone; Winter, Andreas (2013). "Zero-Error Communication via Quantum Channels, Noncommutative Graphs, and a Quantum Lovász Number". IEEE Transactions on Information Theory. 59 (2). Institute of Electrical and Electronics Engineers (IEEE): 1164–1174. arXiv:1002.2514. doi:10.1109/tit.2012.2221677. ISSN 0018-9448. S2CID 4690143.
