= Peres–Horodecki criterion =

Criterion in quantum information theory

The Peres–Horodecki criterion is a necessary condition, for the joint density matrix $\rho$ of two quantum mechanical systems $A$ and $B$, to be separable. It is also called the PPT criterion, for positive partial transpose. In the 2×2 and 2×3 dimensional cases the condition is also sufficient. It is used to decide the separability of mixed states, where the Schmidt decomposition does not apply. The theorem was discovered in 1996 by Asher Peres and the Horodecki family (Michał, Paweł, and Ryszard)

In higher dimensions, the test is inconclusive, and one should supplement it with more advanced tests, such as those based on entanglement witnesses.

== Definition ==
If we have a general state $\rho$ which acts on Hilbert space of $\mathcal{H}_A \otimes \mathcal{H}_B$

$$\rho = \sum_{ijkl} p^{ij}_{kl} |i\rangle \langle j | \otimes |k\rangle \langle l|$$

Its partial transpose (with respect to the B party) is defined as

$$\rho^{T_B} := (I \otimes T) (\rho) = \sum_{ijkl} p^{ij} _{kl} |i\rangle \langle j | \otimes (|k\rangle \langle l|)^T = \sum_{ijkl} p^{ij} _{kl} |i\rangle \langle j | \otimes |l\rangle \langle k| = \sum_{ijkl} p^{ij} _{lk} |i\rangle \langle j | \otimes |k\rangle \langle l|$$

Note that the partial in the name implies that only part of the state is transposed. More precisely, $(I \otimes T) (\rho)$ is the identity map applied to the A party and the transposition map applied to the B party.

This definition can be seen more clearly if we write the state as a block matrix:

$$\rho = \begin{pmatrix} A_{11} & A_{12} & \dots & A_{1n} \\ A_{21} & A_{22} & & \\ \vdots & & \ddots & \\ A_{n1} & & & A_{nn} \end{pmatrix}$$

Where $n = \dim \mathcal{H}_A$, and each block is a square matrix of dimension $m = \dim \mathcal{H}_B$. Then the partial transpose is

$$\rho^{T_B} = \begin{pmatrix} A_{11}^T & A_{12}^T & \dots & A_{1n}^T \\ A_{21}^T & A_{22}^T & & \\ \vdots & & \ddots & \\ A_{n1}^T & & & A_{nn}^T \end{pmatrix}$$

The criterion states that if $\rho\;\!$ is separable then all the eigenvalues of $\rho^{T_B}$ are non-negative. In other words, if $\rho^{T_B}$ has a negative eigenvalue, $\rho\;\!$ is guaranteed to be entangled. The converse of these statements is true if and only if the dimension of the product space is $2 \times 2$ or $2 \times 3$.

The result is independent of the party that was transposed, because $\rho^{T_A} = (\rho^{T_B})^T$.

== Example ==
Consider this 2-qubit family of Werner states:

$$\rho = p |\Psi^-\rangle \langle \Psi^-| + (1-p) \frac{I}{4}$$

It can be regarded as the convex combination of $|\Psi^-\rangle$, a maximally entangled state, and the identity element, a maximally mixed state.

Its density matrix is

$$\rho = \frac{1}{4}\begin{pmatrix}
1-p & 0 & 0 & 0\\
0 & p+1 & -2p & 0\\
0 & -2p & p+1 & 0 \\
0 & 0 & 0 & 1-p\end{pmatrix}$$

and the partial transpose

$$\rho^{T_B} = \frac{1}{4}\begin{pmatrix}
1-p & 0 & 0 & -2p\\
0 & p+1 & 0 & 0\\
0 & 0 & p+1 & 0 \\
-2p & 0 & 0 & 1-p\end{pmatrix}$$

Its least eigenvalue is $(1-3p)/4$. Therefore, the state is entangled for $1 \geq p > 1/3$.

== Demonstration ==
If ρ is separable, it can be written as

$$\rho = \sum p_i \rho^A_i \otimes \rho^B_i$$

In this case, the effect of the partial transposition is trivial:

$$\rho^{T_B} = (I \otimes T )(\rho) = \sum p_i \rho^A_i \otimes (\rho^B_i)^T$$

As the transposition map preserves eigenvalues, the spectrum of $(\rho^B_i)^{T}$ is the same as the spectrum of $\rho^B_i\;\!$, and in particular $(\rho^B_i)^{T}$ must still be positive semidefinite. Thus $\rho^{T_B}$ must also be positive semidefinite. This proves the necessity of the PPT criterion.

Showing that being PPT is also sufficient for the 2 X 2 and 3 X 2 (equivalently 2 X 3) cases is more involved. It was shown by the Horodeckis that for every entangled state there exists an entanglement witness. This is a result of geometric nature and invokes the Hahn–Banach theorem (see reference below).

From the existence of entanglement witnesses, one can show that $I \otimes \Lambda (\rho)$ being positive for all positive maps Λ is a necessary and sufficient condition for the separability of ρ, where Λ maps $B(\mathcal{H}_B)$ to $B(\mathcal{H}_A)$

Furthermore, every positive map from $B(\mathcal{H}_B)$ to $B(\mathcal{H}_A)$ can be decomposed into a sum of completely positive and completely copositive maps, when $\textrm{dim}(\mathcal{H}_B) = 2$ and $\textrm{dim}(\mathcal{H}_A) = 2\;\textrm{or}\;3$. In other words, every such map Λ can be written as

$$\Lambda = \Lambda _1 + \Lambda _2 \circ T,$$

where $\Lambda_1$ and $\Lambda_2$ are completely positive and T is the transposition map. This follows from the Størmer-Woronowicz theorem.

Loosely speaking, the transposition map is therefore the only one that can generate negative eigenvalues in these dimensions. So if $\rho^{T_B}$ is positive, $I \otimes \Lambda (\rho)$ is positive for any Λ. Thus we conclude that the Peres–Horodecki criterion is also sufficient for separability when $\textrm{dim}(\mathcal{H}_A \otimes \mathcal{H}_B) \le 6$.

In higher dimensions, however, there exist maps that can't be decomposed in this fashion, and the criterion is no longer sufficient. Consequently, there are entangled states which have a positive partial transpose. Such states have the interesting property that they are bound entangled, i.e. they can not be distilled for quantum communication purposes.

== Continuous variable systems ==
The Peres–Horodecki criterion has been extended to continuous variable systems. Rajiah Simon formulated a particular version of the PPT criterion in terms of the second-order moments of canonical operators and showed that it is necessary and sufficient for $1\oplus1$-mode Gaussian states (see Ref. for a seemingly different but essentially equivalent approach). It was later found that Simon's condition is also necessary and sufficient for $1\oplus n$-mode Gaussian states, but no longer sufficient for $2\oplus2$-mode Gaussian states. Simon's condition can be generalized by taking into account the higher order moments of canonical operators or by using entropic measures.

== Symmetric systems ==
For symmetric states of bipartite systems, the positivity of the partial transpose of the density matrix is related to the sign of certain two-body correlations. Here, symmetry means that

$$\rho F_{AB}= F_{AB}\rho=\rho,$$

holds, where $F_{AB}$ is the flip or swap operator exchanging the two parties $A$ and $B$. A full basis of the symmetric subspace is of the form $(\vert n\rangle_A \vert m \rangle_B + \vert m\rangle_A \vert n \rangle_B)/\sqrt{2}$ with $m\ne n$ and $\vert n\rangle_A \vert n \rangle_B.$ Here for $n$ and $m,$ $0\le n,m \le d-1$ must hold, where $d$ is the dimension of the two parties.

It can be shown that for such states, $\rho$ has a positive partial transpose if and only if

$$\langle M \otimes M \rangle_\rho \ge 0$$

holds for all operators $M.$ Hence, if $\langle M \otimes M \rangle_\rho < 0$ holds for some $M$ then the state possesses non-PPT entanglement.

Moreover, a bipartite symmetric PPT state can be written as

$$\varrho=\sum_k p_k M_k\otimes M_k,$$

where $p_k$ are probabilities and $M_k$ fulfill ${\rm Tr}(M_k)=1$ and ${\rm Tr}(M_k^2)=1.$ However, for a subsystem larger than a qubit, $M_k$ are not necessarily physical pure density matrices since they can have negative eigenvalues. In this case, even entangled states can be written as a mixture of tensor products of single-party aphysical states, very similar to the form of separable states. In the qubit case, $M_k$ are physical density matrices, which is consistent with the fact that for two qubits all PPT states are separable.

The concept of such pseudomixtures has been extended to non-symmetric states and to the multipartite case, by the definition of pseudoseparable states

$$\varrho=\sum_k p_k M_k^{(1)}\otimes M_k^{(2)}\otimes ... \otimes M_k^{(N)},$$

where $N$ is the number of subsystems and $M_k^{(n)}$ fulfill ${\rm Tr}(M_k^{(n)})=1$ and ${\rm Tr}[(M_k^{(n)})^2]=1.$ The single subsystem aphysical states $M_k^{(n)}$ are just states that live on the higher dimensional equivalent of the Bloch sphere even for systems that are larger than a qubit. Separable states are the subset of the set of pseudoseparable states, while for qubits the two sets coincide with each other. For systems larger than qubits, such quantum states can be entangled, and in this case they can have PPT or non-PPT bipartitions.
