= University of Gdańsk =

Public university in Gdańsk, Poland

- Uniwersytet Gdański
- Latin: Universitas Gedanensis
- Motto: In mari via tua (In sea your way)
- Established: 20 March 1970
- Rector: Prof. dr hab. Piotr Stepnowski
- Faculty: 1,700
- Students: 19,726 (12.2023)
- Location: Gdańsk, Pomeranian Voivodeship, Poland; 54°23′58″N 18°34′7″E Building details
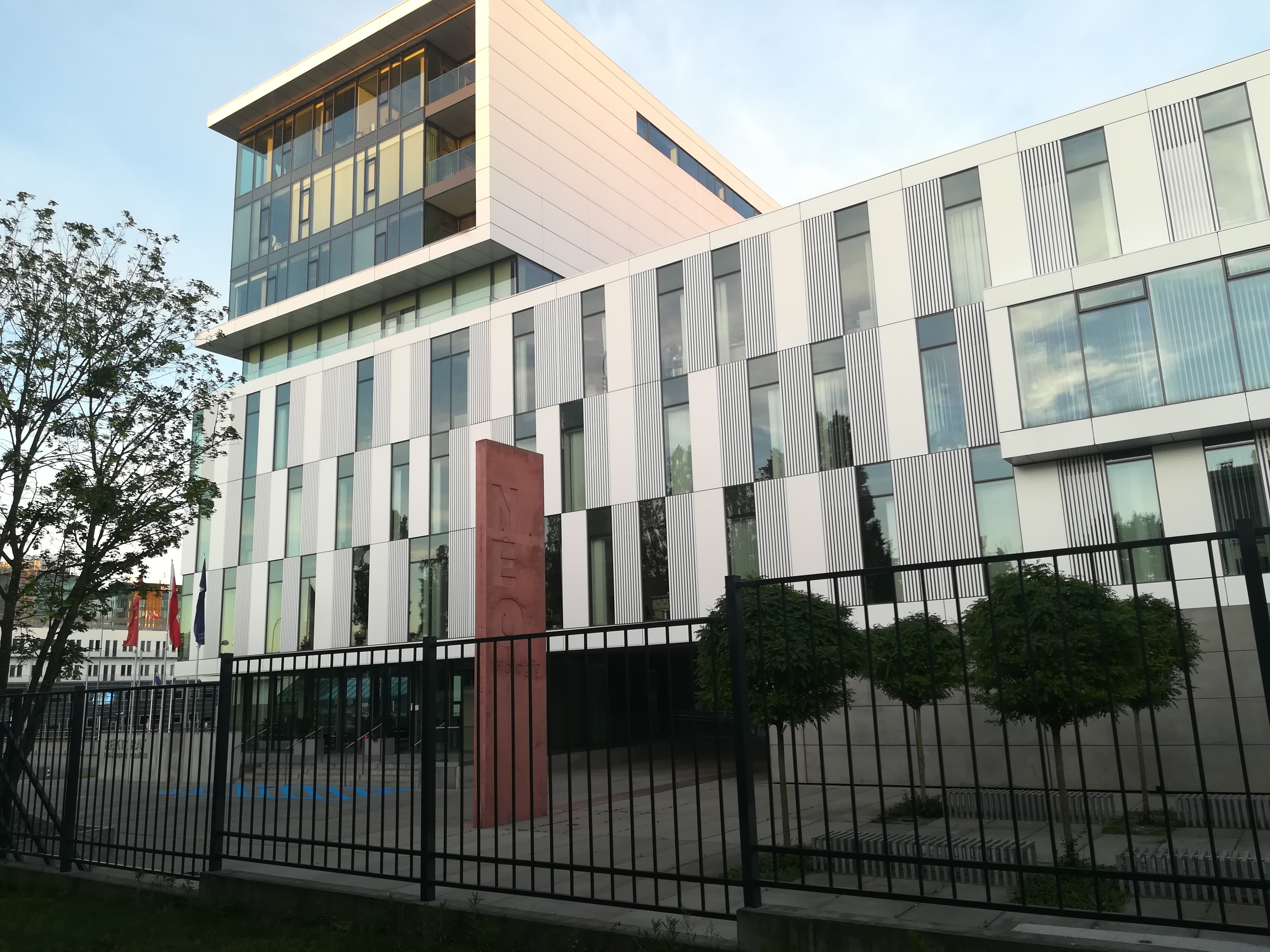
- Rectorate building
- Website: https://en.ug.edu.pl

University rankings

Global – Overall
- QS World: 851-900 (2026)

Regional – Overall
- QS Emerging Europe and Central Asia: 77 (2022)

The University of Gdańsk (Polish: Uniwersytet Gdański, UG) is a public research university located in Gdańsk, Poland. It is one of the top 10 universities in Poland and an important centre for the studies of the Kashubian language.

== History ==
The University of Gdańsk was established in 1970 by the merger of the Higher School of Economics in Sopot (founded in 1945) and Gdańsk College of Education (formed in 1946). Nowadays, the University of Gdańsk is the largest institution of higher learning in Poland's northern region of Pomerania. The University of Gdańsk boasts significant scientific achievement which enforces its leading position, particularly through activity and research connected with the sea. In this regard, the university has been involved in cooperation with scientific research centres from nearly all corners of the globe.

The University of Gdańsk is involved in the creation of a network of European universities selected in the ‘European Universities’ competition organised by the European Commission in conjunction with its partners, the University of Cádiz (Spain), the University of Split (Croatia), the Université de Bretagne Occidentale (France), Kiel University (Germany) and the University of Malta (Malta), the University of Gdańsk forms a consortium of the European University of the Seas (SEA-EU).

In 2020, the university became a member of the Daniel Fahrenheit Association of Gdańsk Universities (Polish: Związek Uczelni w Gdańsku im. Daniela Fahrenheita) which brings together the city's major institutions of higher education including the Gdańsk University of Technology and the Medical University of Gdańsk. The objective of the newly established organization is to work on projects aimed at further federalization of the universities, to bolster the scientific cooperation among them and to pursue a common promotional and ranking policy.

== Ranking ==
The University of Gdańsk has been listed in world rankings, joining the ranks of the best Polish universities. Its presence in such international rankings as the QS World University Ranking or the Times Higher Education (THE) World University Ranking is a reflection of its quality of education, scientific research conducted, and international standing as well as level of knowledge transfer to the economy. The dynamic development of the University of Gdańsk is reflected in its presence amongst the world's 200 best young universities in the Times Higher Education (THE) Young University Rankings 2019 in which the University of Gdańsk was the only Polish university to feature.

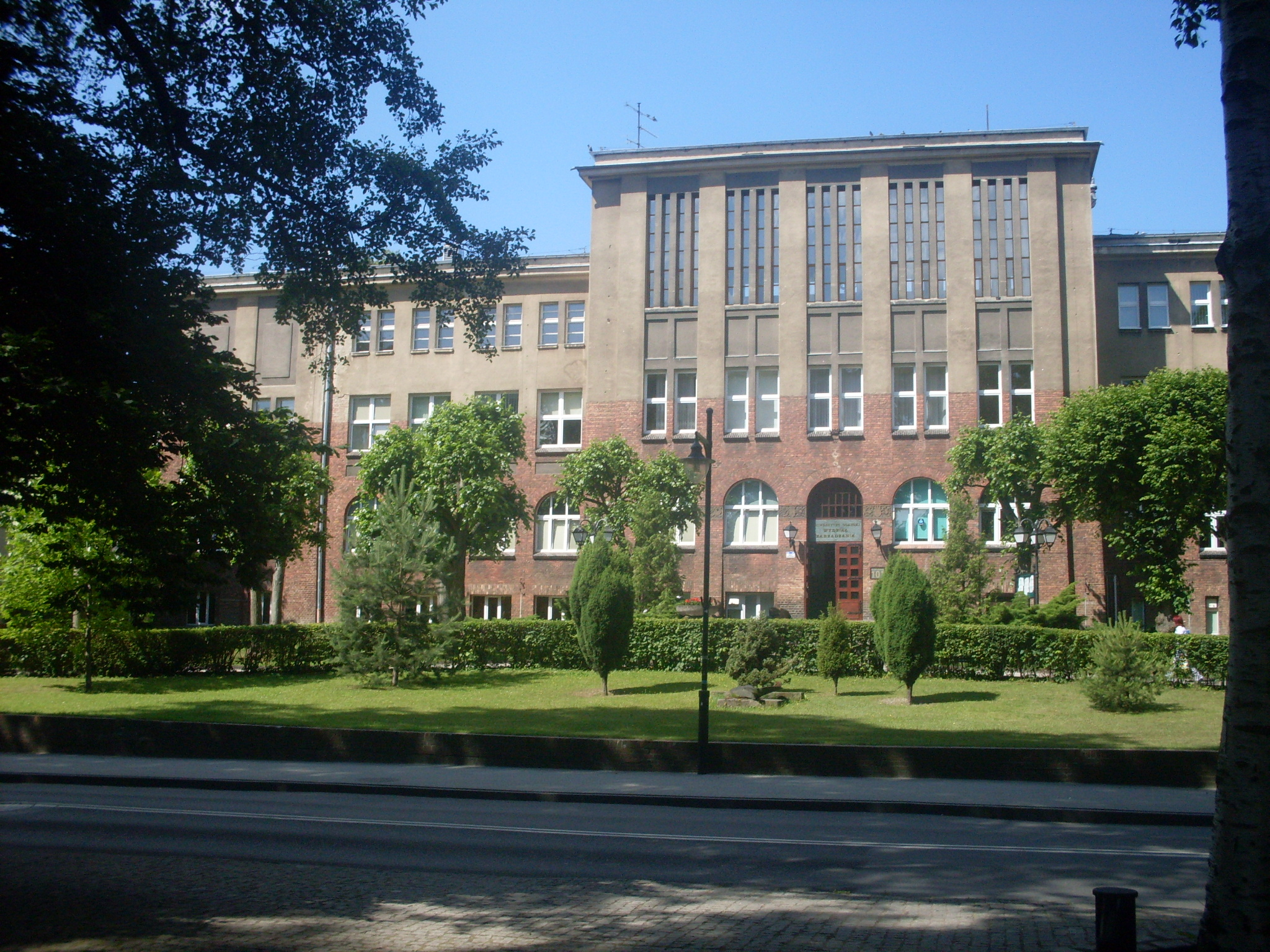
Faculty of Management, University of Gdańsk

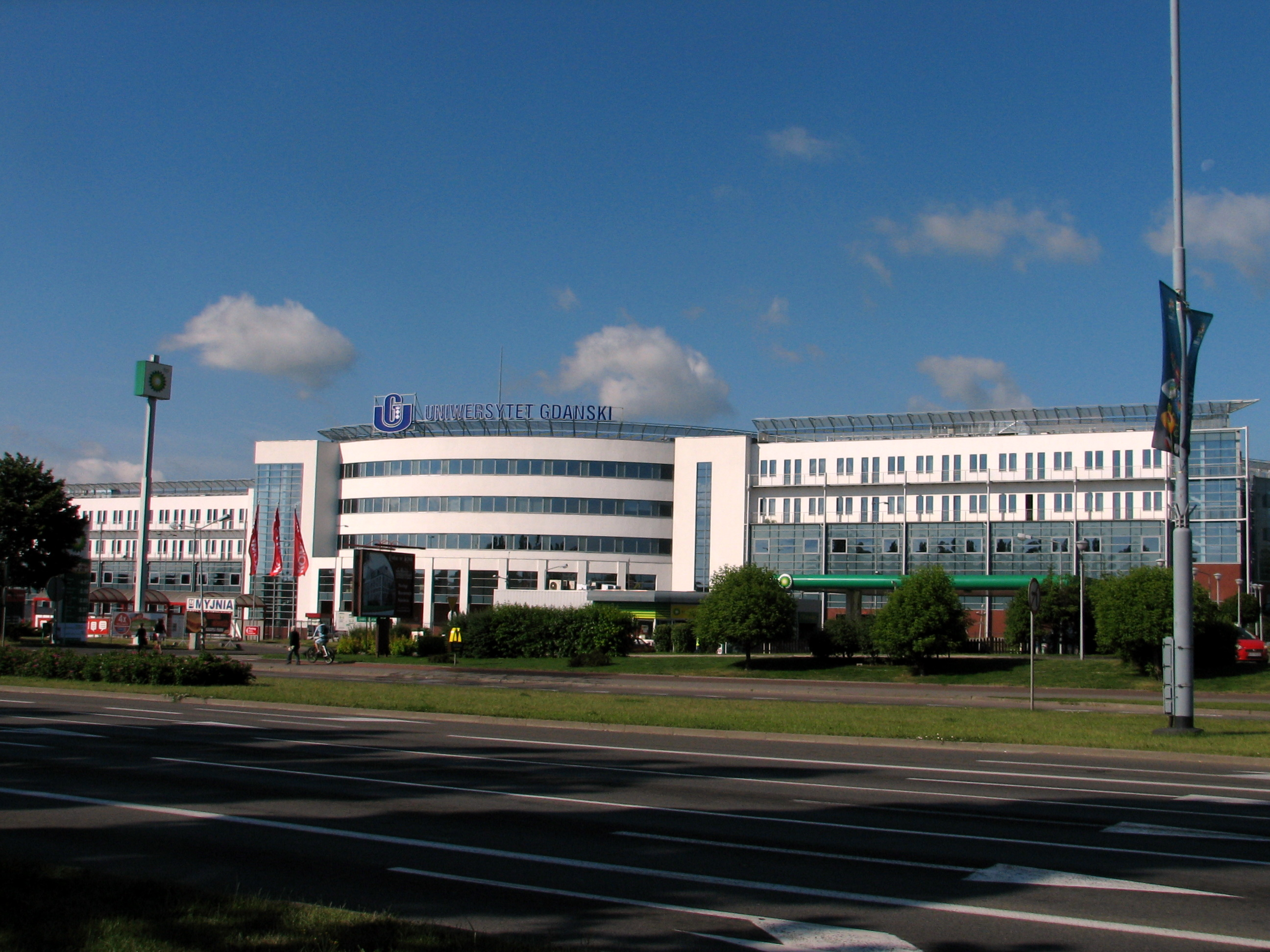
Faculty of Social Sciences

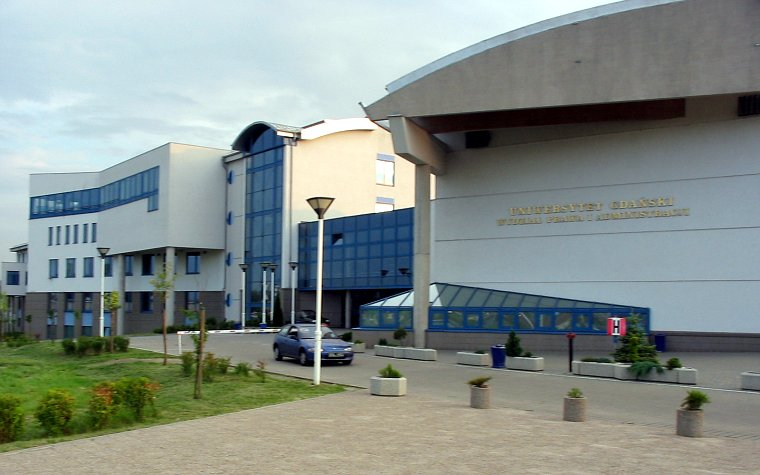
Faculty of Law and Administration

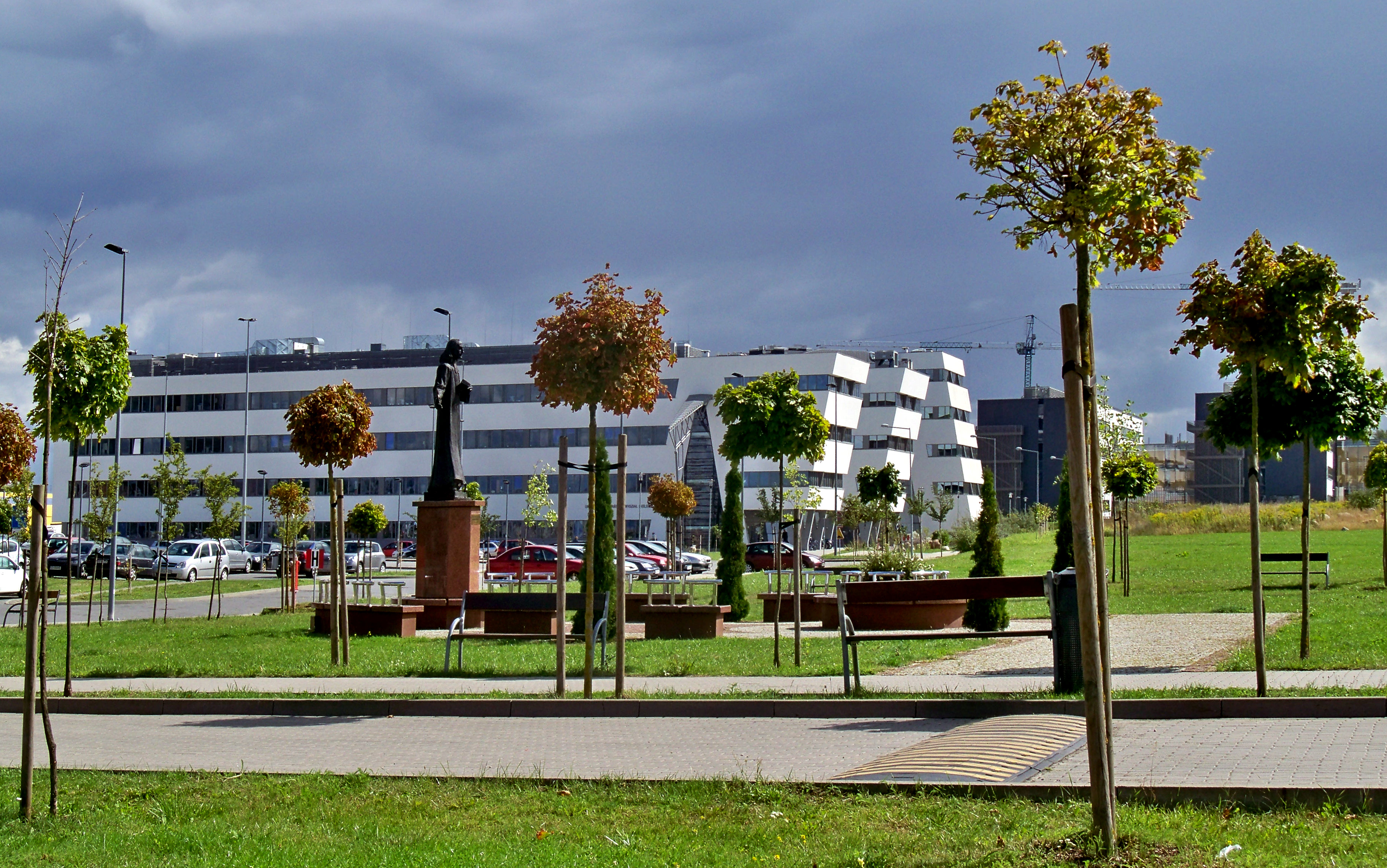
Faculty of Biology

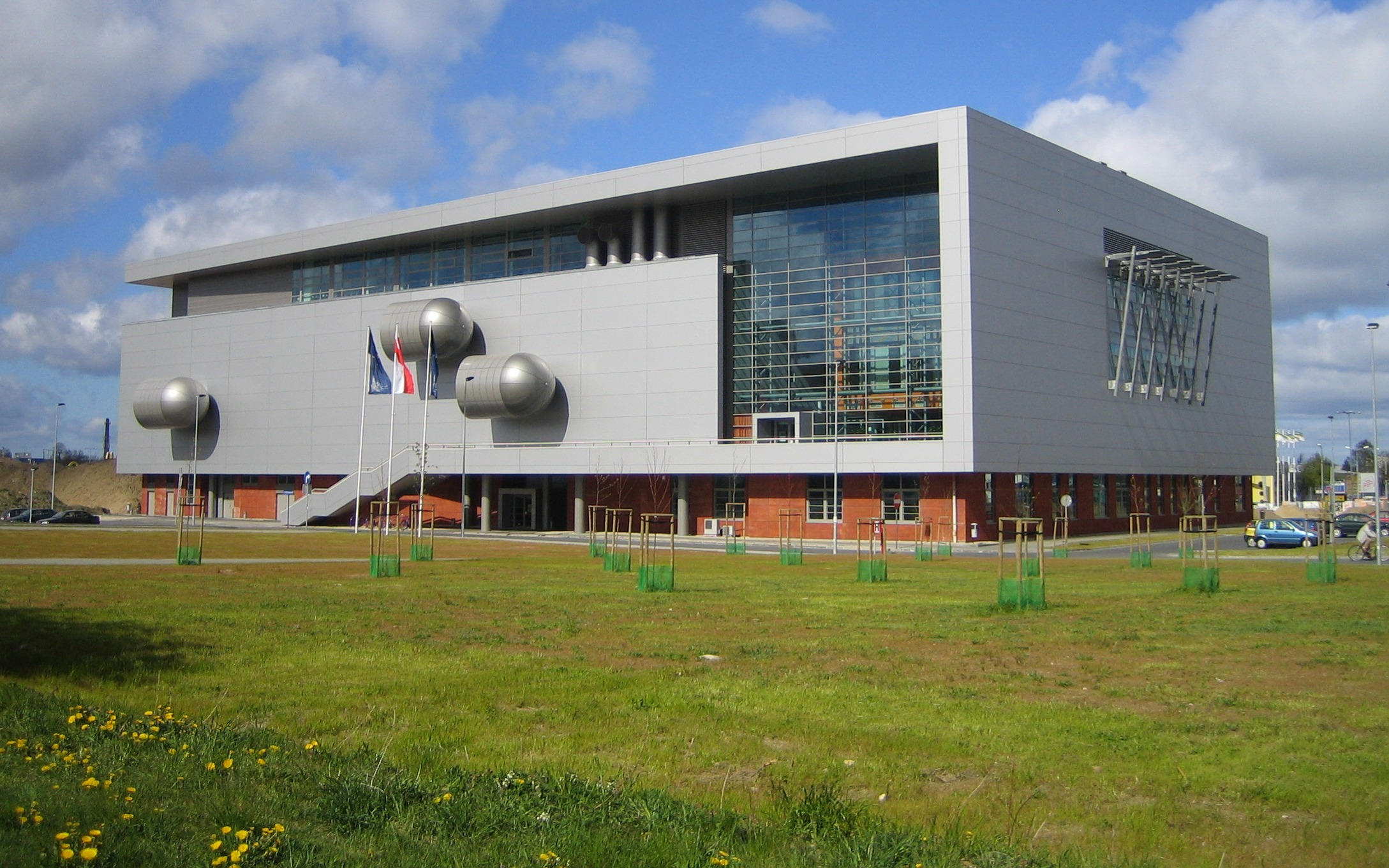
University Library

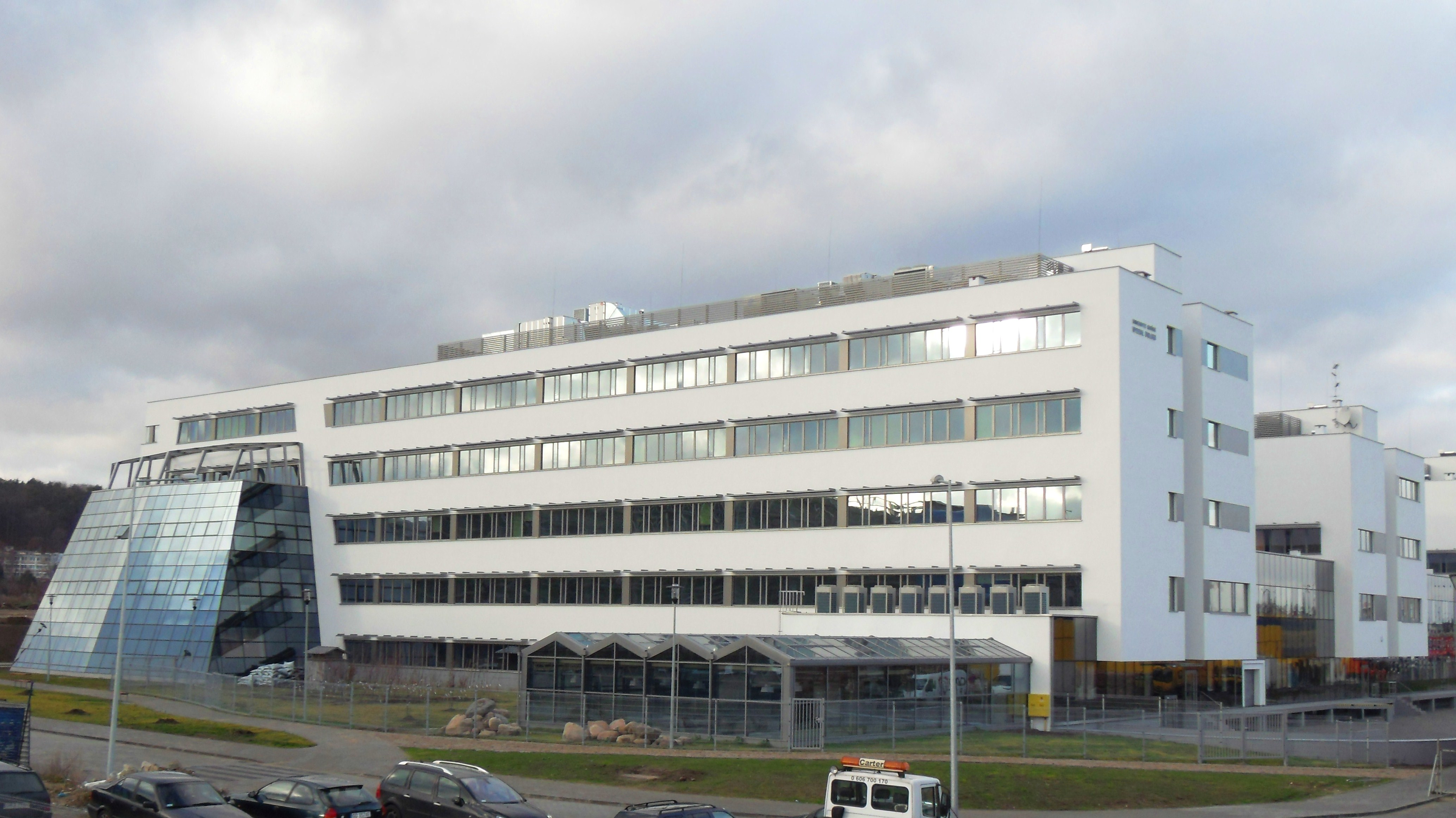
Faculty of Biology

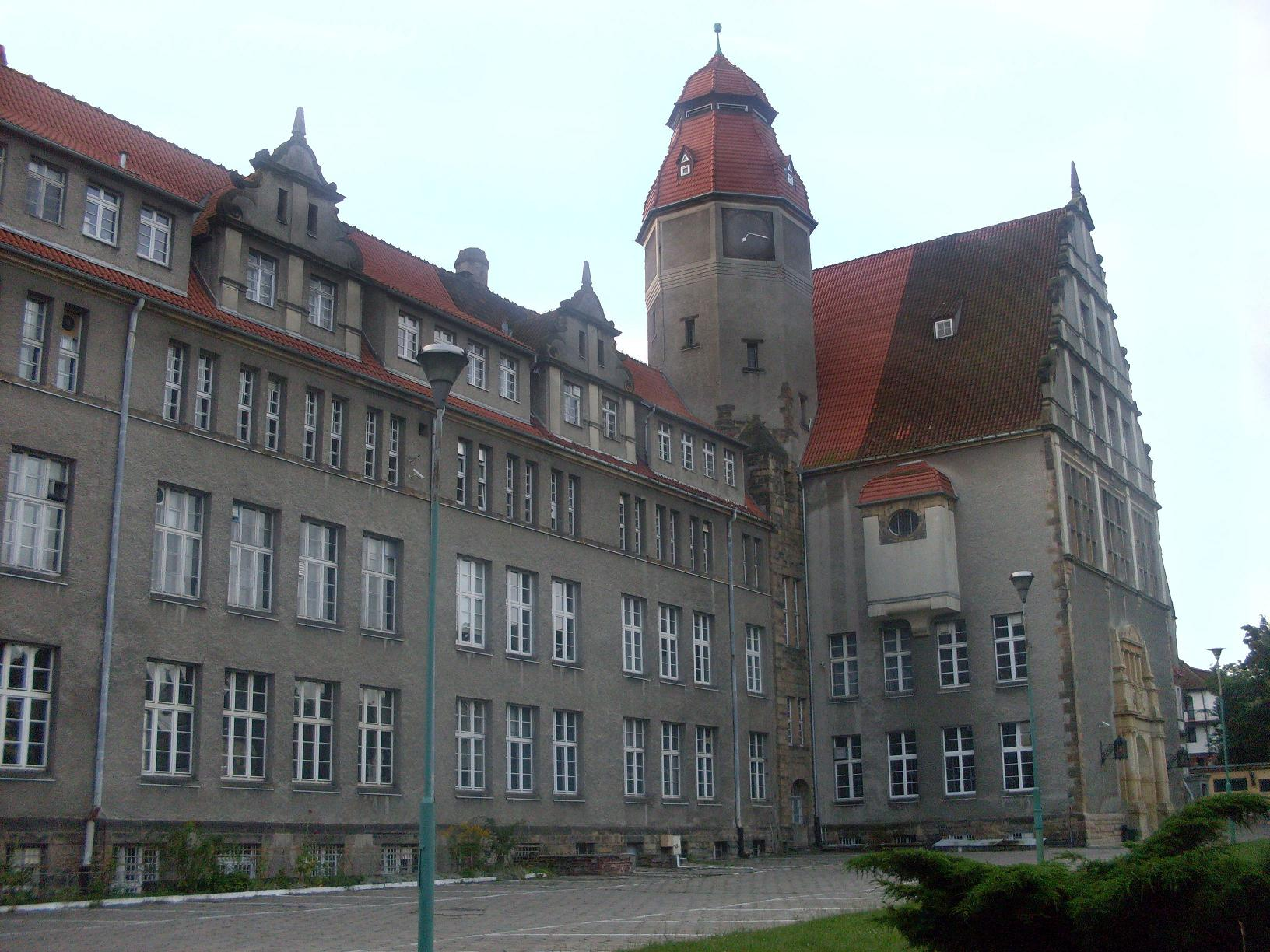
Historic Building of the Faculty of Chemistry

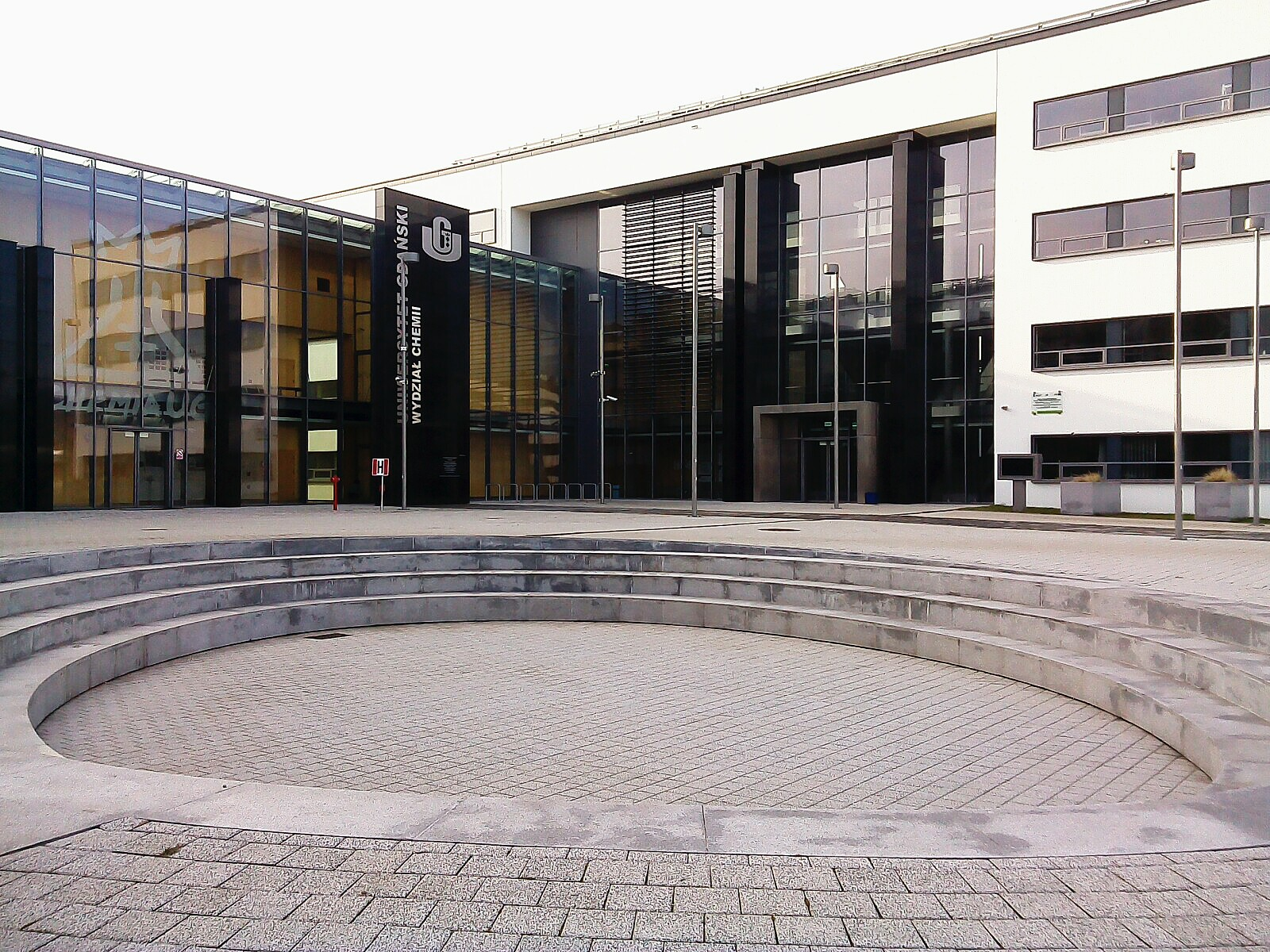
New Building of the Faculty of Chemistry

== School authorities ==
- Rector: Prof. dr hab. Piotr Stepnowski
- Vice-Rector for International Cooperation: dr hab. Anna Jurkowska-Zeidler
- Vice-Rector for Research: Prof. dr hab. Wiesław Laskowski
- Vice-Rector for Student Affairs and Teaching Quality: dr hab.. Arnold Kłonczyński
- Vice-Rector for Innovations and Cooperation with Business and Industry: Prof. dr hab. Krzysztof Bielawski
- Director of Administration: mgr Jacek Jętczak

== Staff ==
- Professors: 282
- Habilitation doctors: 171
- Senior lecturers: 640
- Teachers (total): 1,700
- Total staff: 2,964

Notable professors and lecturers affiliated with the University of Gdańsk:

- Stefan Chwin, novelist, literary critic
- Andrzej Gąsiorowski, political scientist
- Zbigniew Herbert, poet, essayist and moralist
- Ryszard Horodecki, physicist
- Maria Janion, theoretician of literature, feminist
- Janusz Lewandowski, politician and economist, former Budget and Financial Programming Commissioner of the European Commission
- Małgorzata Omilanowska, historian and politician, former Minister of Culture and National Heritage of Poland
- Jerzy Samp, writer and publicist
- Joanna Senyszyn, politician
- Brunon Synak, sociologist
- Jerzy Treder, linguist
- Marek Żukowski, theoretical physicist

== Number of students ==
- Day studies: 15,151
- Evening studies: 3,753
- Extramural studies: 10,884
- Doctoral studies: 1,609
- Total: 27,233

== Levels of study offered by institution ==
- Shorter/intermediate university level qualifications
- First main university level final qualifications
- Advanced/postgraduate study
- Doctorate
- Higher/post doctorate

== Diplomas and degrees ==
- Bachelor – B.A.
- Master of Arts – M.A.
- Doctor – Dr
- Doctor Habilitated – Dr hab.

== International cooperation ==
- Copenhagen Business School – Denmark
- NEOMA Business School – France
- Hiroshima University – Japan
- Katholieke Universiteit Leuven – Belgium
- Lumière University Lyon 2 – France
- University of Antwerp – Belgium
- University of Beira Interior – Portugal
- Universität Bremen – Germany
- University of Linköping – Sweden
- University of Messina – Italy
- University of Plymouth – United Kingdom
- Universität Rostock – Germany
- University of Turku – Finland
- University of Washington's School of Marine Affairs (SMA) – United States of America
- Sholokhov Moscow State University for Humanities – Russia
- University of Applied Sciences Upper Austria – Austria

== Faculties ==
- Faculty of Biology
- Faculty of Chemistry
- Faculty of Economics
- Faculty of History
- Faculty of Languages
- Faculty of Law and Administration
- Faculty of Management
- Faculty of Mathematics, physics and Informatics
- Faculty of Oceanography and Geography
- Faculty of Social science
- Intercollegiate Faculty of Biotechnology (with Medical University of Gdańsk)

== Notable alumni ==
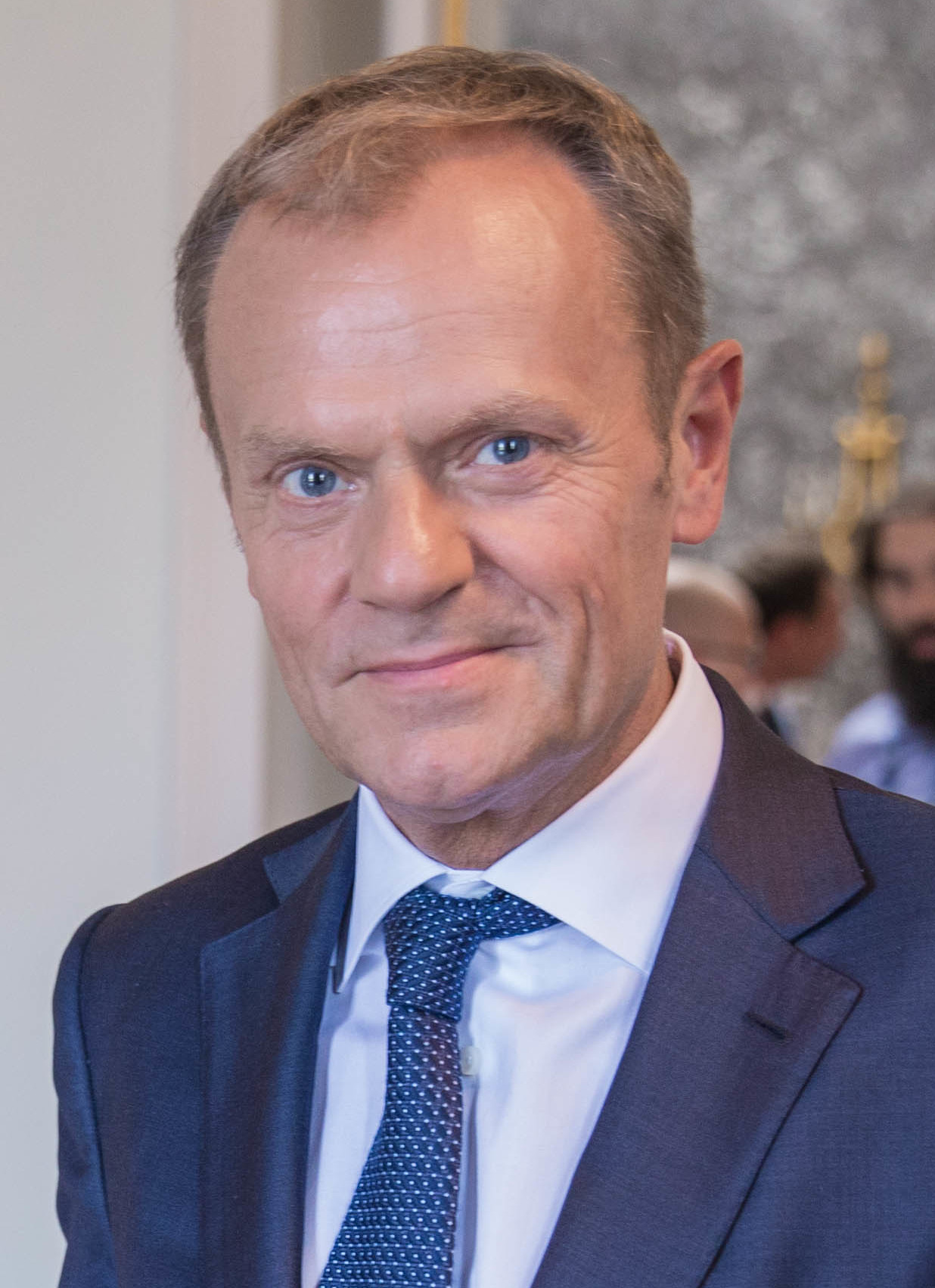
Donald Tusk, Prime Minister and President of the European Council

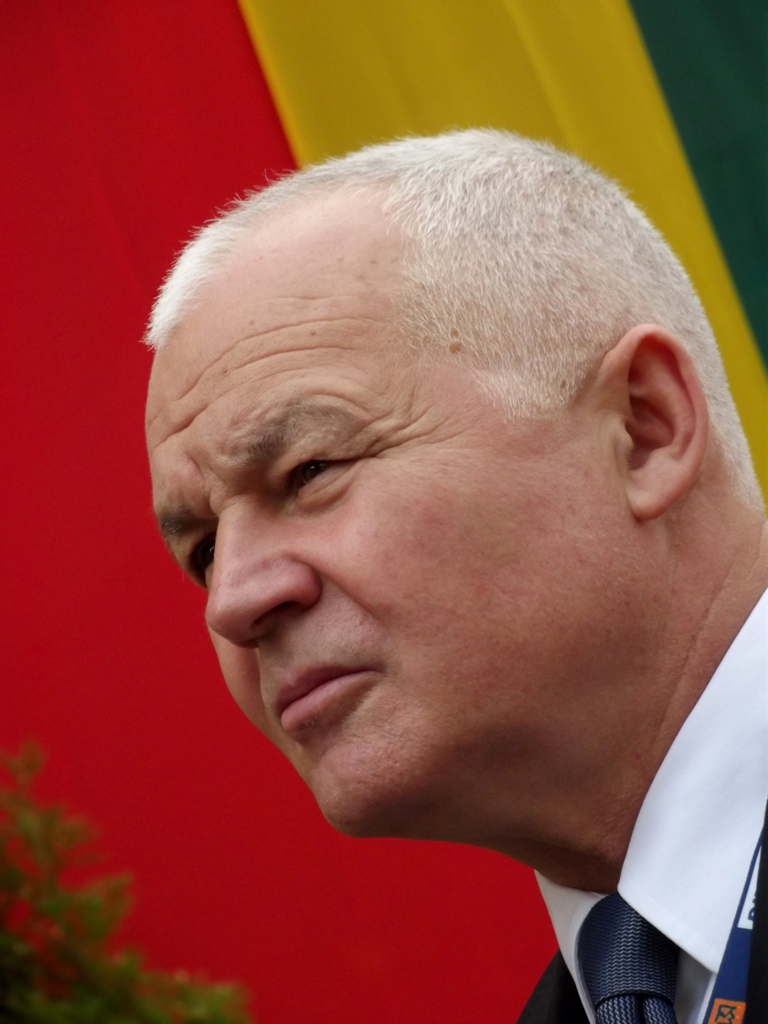
Jan Krzysztof Bielecki, former Prime Minister, chairman of Polish Institute of International Affairs

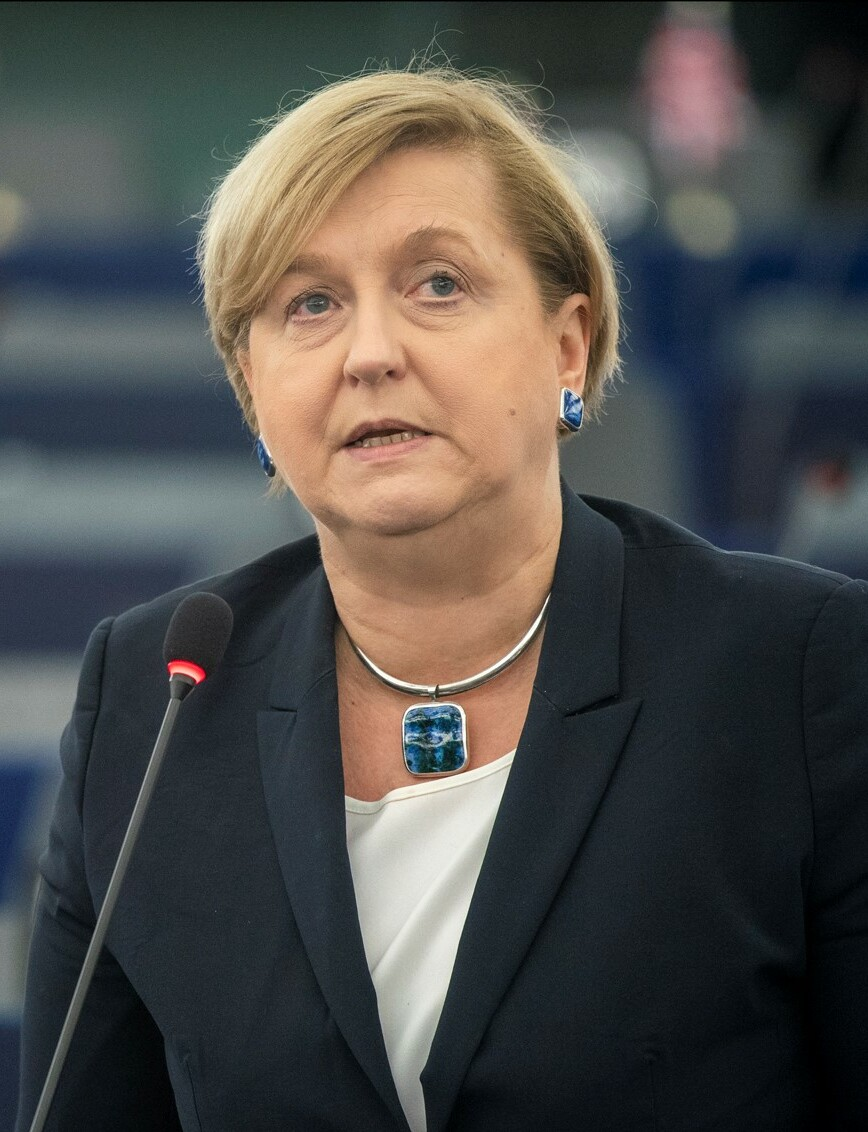
Anna Fotyga, Member of the European Parliament and former Minister of Foreign Affairs

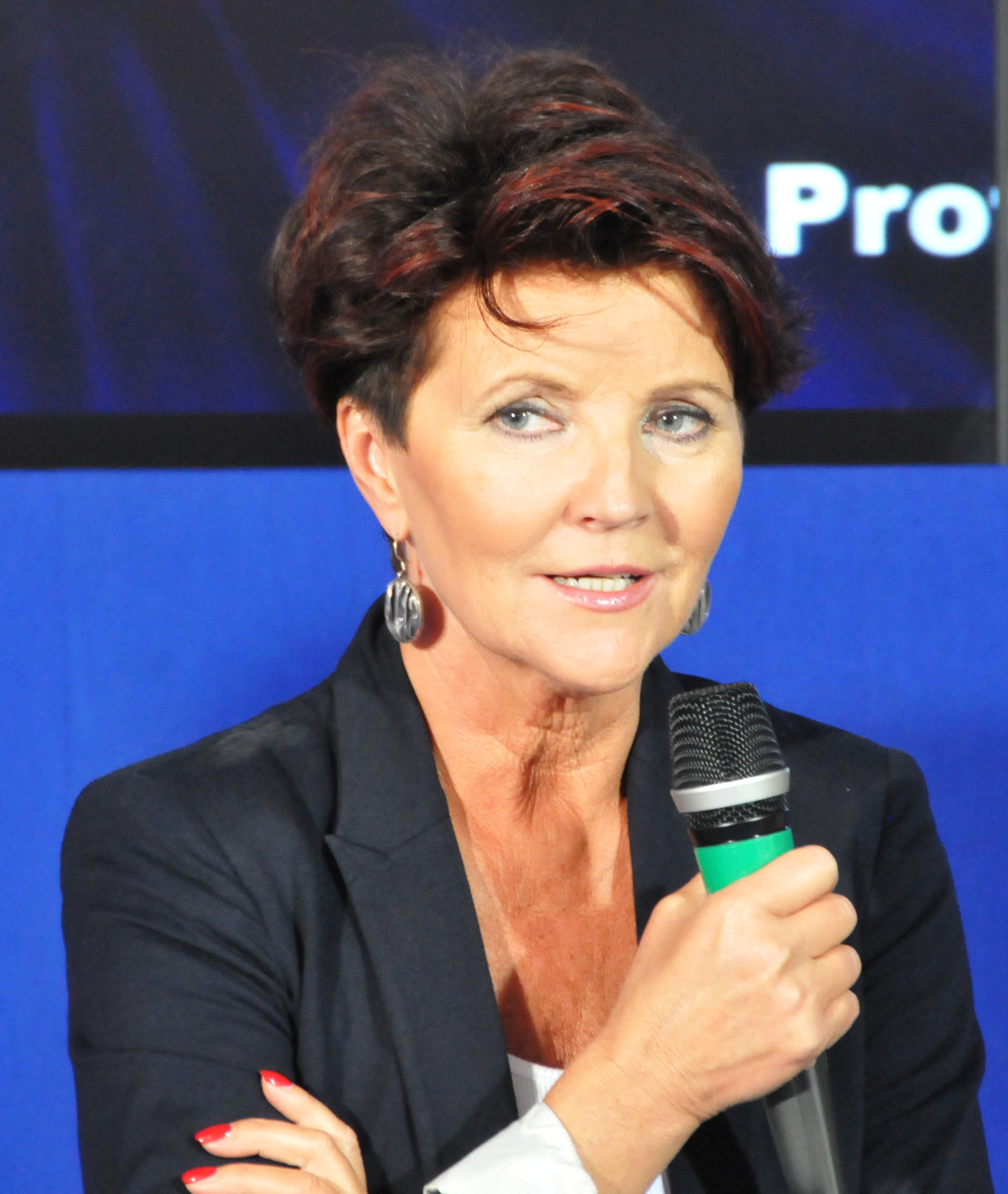
Jolanta Kwasniewska, lawyer and charity activist, former First Lady of Poland

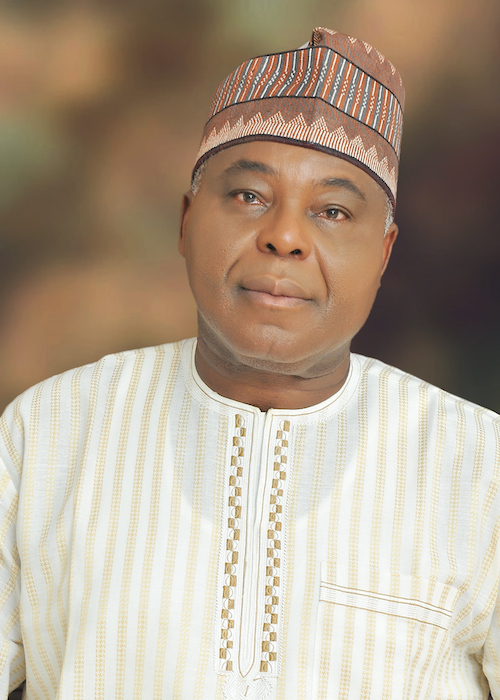
Raymond Dokpesi, Nigerian media entrepreneur

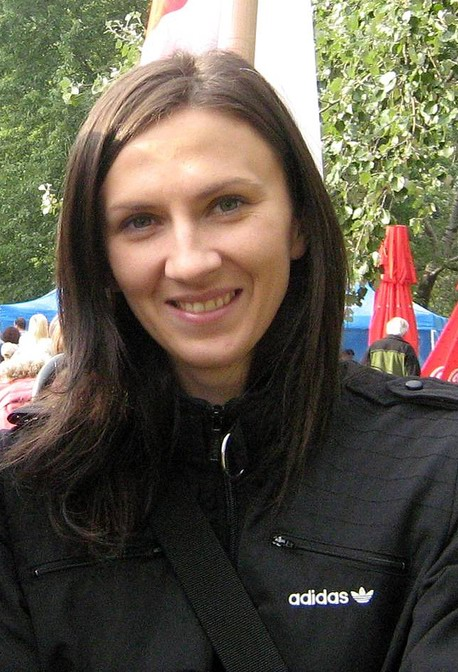
Monika Pyrek, pole vaulter, multiple Olympic medallist

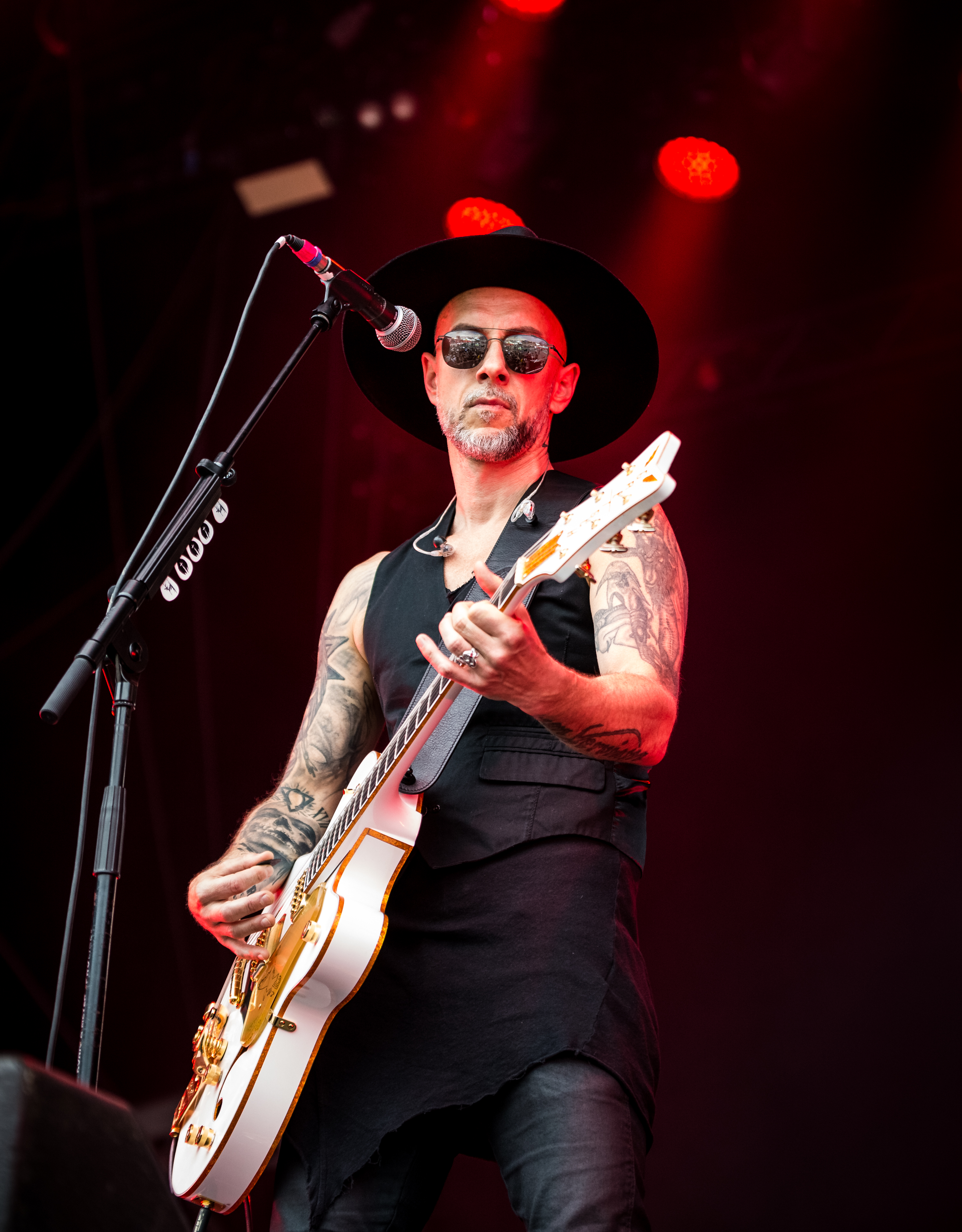
Adam Darski, musician, leader of extreme metal band Behemoth

Other notable alumni include:

- Paweł Adamowicz (1965–2019), former mayor of Gdańsk
- Jolanta Banach (born 1958), politician
- Marek Biernacki (born 1959), lawyer and politician
- Kamil Bortniczuk (born 1983), Polish Minister of Sport and Tourism
- Andrzej Butkiewicz (1955–2008), political activist opposing Communism in Poland during the 1970s and 1980s, member of the Solidarity Movement
- Selim Chazbijewicz (born 1955), political scientist, columnist, and poet
- Stefan Chwin (born 1949), Polish novelist, literary critic, and historian of literature
- Tadeusz Cymański (born 1955), politician
- Izabela Dłużyk (born 1989), nature sound recordist, included on BBC's 100 Women list (2023)
- Piotr Domaradzki (1946–2015), Polish-American journalist, essayist and historian
- Aleksandra Dulkiewicz (born 1979), lawyer and current mayor of Gdańsk
- Jacek Gdański (born 1970), chess grandmaster and the 1992 Polish Chess Champion
- Abelard Giza (born 1980), Polish comedian, writer, filmmaker, and actor
- Ryszard Horodecki (born 1943), physicist known for the Peres–Horodecki criterion
- Pawel Huelle (born 1957), writer and journalist
- Maria Kaczyńska (1942–2010), former First Lady of Poland
- Wojciech Kasperski (born 1981), screenwriter, film director and producer
- Aneta Kręglicka (born 1965), dancer, Miss World 1989
- Janusz Lewandowski (born 1951), former Budget and Financial Programming Commissioner of the European Commission
- Marta Lewicka (born 1972), Polish-American mathematician
- Jakobe Mansztajn (born 1982), poet, blogger
- Maciej Płażyński (1958–2010), politician, one of the founders of the Civic Platform party
- Jerzy Samp (1951–2015), writer and publicist
- Wojciech Szczurek (born 1963), mayor of Gdynia
- Elżbieta Zawacka (1909–2009), university professor, scouting instructor, SOE agent and freedom fighter during World War II. She was also a brigadier general of the Polish Army (the second and last woman in the history of the Polish Army to hold this rank)
- Maciej Żylicz (born 1953), biochemist and molecular biologist

== See also ==
- Kashubian studies
- List of universities in Poland
