= List of quantum key distribution protocols =

Quantum key distribution (QKD) protocols are used in quantum key distribution. The first protocol of that kind was BB84, introduced in 1984 by Charles H. Bennett and Gilles Brassard. After that, many other protocols have been defined.

== List of quantum key distribution protocols ==
- BB84 (1984) is a quantum key distribution scheme that allows two parties to securely communicate a private key for use in one-time pad encryption using the quantum property that information gain is only possible at the expense of disturbing the signal if the two states one is trying to distinguish are not orthogonal and an authenticated public classical channel.
- E91 protocol (1991) is a quantum cryptography method that uses entangled pairs of photons to generate keys for secure communication, with the ability to detect any attempts at eavesdropping by an external party through the violation of Bell's Theorem and the preservation of perfect correlation between the measurements of the two parties.
- BBM92 protocol (1992) is a quantum key distribution method that uses polarized entangled photon pairs and decoy states to securely transmit non-orthogonal quantum signals.
- B92 protocol (1992) is a quantum key distribution method that uses entanglement distillation protocols to prepare and transmit nonorthogonal quantum states with unconditional security, even over lossy and noisy channels, by measuring the state on the Z basis and using local filtering and Z basis measurements to ensure the security of the transmission is determined by the number of errors and the number of filter pairs used.
- MSZ96 protocol (1996) uses four nonorthogonal quantum states of a weak optical field to encode a cryptographic key bit without the use of photon polarization or entangled photons.
- Six-state protocol (1998) is a method of transmitting secure information using quantum cryptography that is more resistant to noise and easier to detect errors in compared to the BB84 protocol, due to its use of a six-state polarization scheme on three orthogonal bases and its ability to tolerate a noisier channel.
- DPS protocol (2002) is a simple and efficient quantum key distribution (QKD) method that does not require a basis selection process like the traditional BB84 protocol, has a simpler receiver configuration with fewer detectors, uses efficient sequential pulses in the time domain for high key creation speed, and is robust against photon-number splitting attacks even with weak coherent light.
- Decoy state protocol (2003) is a method used in practical quantum cryptography systems that uses multiple intensity levels at the transmitter's source and monitors bit error rates to detect and prevent photon number splitting attacks, enabling higher secure transmission rates or longer maximum channel lengths.
- SARG04 (2004) is a quantum key distribution protocol that was developed as a more robust version of BB84, especially against photon-number-splitting attacks, for use with attenuated laser pulses in situations where the information is originated by a Poissonian source producing weak pulses and received by an imperfect detector.
- COW protocol (2005) allows for secure communication between two parties by transmitting a key using weak coherent pulses of light and has advantages of requiring only a random number generator on the client side and being able to transmit key information at a high rate.
- Three-stage quantum cryptography protocol (2006) is a method of data encryption that uses random polarization rotations by the two authenticated parties, to continuously encrypt data using single photons and can also be used for exchanging keys, with the possibility of multi-photon quantum cryptography and the ability to address man-in-the-middle attacks through modification.
- KMB09 protocol (2009) allows for increased transmission distances between Alice and Bob by using two mutually unbiased bases and introducing a minimum index transmission error rate and quantum bit error rate, which is particularly effective for higher-dimensional photon states.
- HDQKD is a technology that enables secure communication between two parties by encoding quantum information in high dimensions, such as optical angular momentum modes, and transmitting it over long distances through multicore fibers or free-space links.
- T12 protocol aims to increase the practicality of QKD by removing certain idealizations and including features that can increase the key rate of the system.
- AWEM-QKD (2025) is a next-generation QKD protocol introduced in 2025 that enhances traditional schemes like BB84 and E91 by integrating adaptive quantum logic and error correction mechanisms. The protocol employs three novel quantum logics — Quantum Adaptive Hadamard (QAH), Quantum Conditional Entanglement Logic (QCEL), and Adaptive Measurement Validation Logic (AMVL). These logics dynamically adjust gate behavior to counteract channel noise, reduce QBER (Quantum Bit Error Rate), and strengthen resistance against eavesdropping. Unlike static protocols, AWEM-QKD adapts to varying quantum channel conditions in real time, ensuring stable and secure key generation. The system also incorporates adaptive error correction and privacy amplification, resulting in significantly improved key accuracy and security resilience compared to traditional QKD methods. This makes AWEM-QKD a robust and mathematically proven protocol for secure quantum communications. AWEM-QKD is introduced by Varun Krishna in 2025 July.
