= Jennewein =

Jennewein is a surname. Notable people with the surname include:

- C. Paul Jennewein (1890–1978), German-born American sculptor
- Jim Jennewein, American screenwriter and writer
- Jim Jennewein (architect) (1929–2022), American architect
- Josef Jennewein (1919–1943), Austrian-German alpine skier and world champion
- Mimi Jennewein (1920–2006), American painter
- Thomas Jennewein, Austrian physicist

== See also ==
- Jenewein
