= KLJN Secure Key Exchange =

Cryptographic key exchange methodology

Random-resistor-random-temperature Kirchhoff-law-Johnson-noise key exchange, also known as RRRT-KLJN or simply KLJN, is an approach for distributing cryptographic keys between two parties that claims to offer unconditional security. This claim, which has been contested, is significant, as the only other key exchange approach claiming to offer unconditional security is Quantum key distribution.

The KLJN secure key exchange scheme was proposed in 2005 by Laszlo Kish and Granqvist. It has the advantage over quantum key distribution in that it can be performed over a metallic wire with just four resistors, two noise generators, and four voltage measuring devices---equipment that is low-priced and can be readily manufactured. It has the disadvantage that several attacks against KLJN have been identified which must be defended against.

"Given that the amount of effort and funding that goes into Quantum Cryptography is substantial (some even mock it as a distraction from the ultimate prize which is quantum computing), it seems to me that the fact that classic thermodynamic resources allow for similar inherent security should give one pause," wrote Henning Dekant, the founder of the Quantum Computing Meetup, in April 2013.

The Cybersecurity Curricula 2017, a joint project of the Association for Computing Machinery, the IEEE Computer Society, the Association for Information Systems, and the International Federation for Information Processing Technical Committee on Information Security Education (IFIP WG 11.8) recommends teaching the KLJN Scheme as part of teaching "Advanced concepts" in its knowledge unit on cryptography.

== See Also/Further Reading ==
- Vadai, Gergely; Mingesz, Robert; Gingl, Zoltan (3 September 2015). "Generalized Kirchhoff-Law-Johnson-Noise (KLJN) secure key exchange system using arbitrary resistors". Scientific Reports. 5 (13653 (2015)) 13653. arXiv:1506.00950. Bibcode:2015NatSR...513653V. doi:10.1038/srep13653. ISSN 2045-2322. LCCN 2011250880. OCLC 732869387. PMC 4558598. PMID 26333562.
- http://www.scholarpedia.org/article/Secure_communications_using_the_KLJN_scheme
- http://noise.ece.tamu.edu/research_files/research_secure.htm
- Science: Simple Noise May Stymie Spies without Quantum Weirdness, Adrian Cho, September 30, 2005. http://noise.ece.tamu.edu/news_files/science_secure.pdf

== See also ==
- List of quantum key distribution protocols
