= MSZ96 =

MSZ96 is a quantum key distribution protocol which allows a cryptographic key bit to be encoded using four nonorthogonal quantum states described by non-commuting quadrature phase amplitudes of a weak optical field, without photon polarization (BB84 protocol) or entangled photons (E91 protocol). It is named after Yi Mu, Jessica Seberry; Yuliang Zheng.

== See also ==
- List of quantum key distribution protocols
