= Antonio Acín =

Spanish theoretical physicist

- Born: Catalonia
- Education: University of Barcelona
- Known for: Acín decomposition SARG04
- Scientific career
- Fields: Theoretical Physics
- Workplaces: ICFO – The Institute of Photonic Sciences

Antonio Acín Dal Maschio is a Spanish theoretical physicist, currently an ICREA professor at ICFO – The Institute of Photonic Sciences in Castelldefels, near Barcelona.

== Research interests ==
Acín's primary research interest lies in quantum information theory, with a particular focus on entanglement characterization and quantum nonlocality. He is also involved in developing quantum communication protocols, emphasizing quantum cryptography and randomness.

== Education ==
Antonio Acín received his undergraduate education in both Telecommunication Engineering at the Polytechnic University of Catalonia from 1990 to 1997 and Physics at the University of Barcelona from 1993 to 1997. He then pursued his doctoral studies at the University of Barcelona and earned his Doctorate in Theoretical Physics in 2001.

== Research career ==
Antonio Acín began his research career as a post-doctoral researcher at the University of Geneva's GAP-Optique with Nicolas Gisin from October 2001 to March 2003, focusing on theoretical aspects of quantum information. In April 2003, he moved to ICFO – The Institute of Photonic Sciences, where he continued his post-doctoral work until December 2004. Acín then transitioned into a faculty position at ICFO, serving as an assistant professor from January 2005 to December 2007. He was subsequently promoted to Professor in January 2008. Later that year in September 2008, Acín was appointed as an ICREA Professor at ICFO – The Institute of Photonic Sciences.

Acín's research has been recognized with several grants and awards, such as the European Research Council (ERC) Advanced Grant CERQUTE (2020–2024), ERC Consolidator Grant QITBOX (2014–2019), ERC Proof-of-Concept MAMBO (2012–2013), and ERC Starting Grant PERCENT (2008–2013). He was also awarded the AXA Chair in Quantum Information Science, the prize "La Recherche" in 2011 and the Paul Ehrenfest Best Paper Award for Quantum Foundations in 2018 and 2022.

Acín has served on the Scientific Advisory Board of several research institutes, including the Centre for Quantum Technologies in Singapore, the Institute for Quantum Optics and Quantum Information in Vienna, and the International Advisory Council of the International Institute of Physics in Natal.

== Popular Science Work ==
Antonio Acín has been involved in promoting scientific understanding among the general public. He has given a number of educational talks aimed at non-scientists and written several popular science articles. He is also the author of a book.

== Selected publications ==
- Acín, Antonio; Brunner, Nicolas; Gisin, Nicolas; Massar, Serge; Pironio, Stefano; Scarani, Valerio (4 June 2007). "Device-Independent Security of Quantum Cryptography against Collective Attacks". Physical Review Letters. 98 (23) 230501. arXiv:quant-ph/0702152. Bibcode:2007PhRvL..98w0501A. doi:10.1103/PhysRevLett.98.230501. PMID 17677888. S2CID 14083927.
- Pironio, S.; Acín, A.; Massar, S.; de la Giroday, A. Boyer; Matsukevich, D. N.; Maunz, P.; Olmschenk, S.; Hayes, D.; Luo, L.; Manning, T. A.; Monroe, C. (April 2010). "Random numbers certified by Bell's theorem". Nature. 464 (7291): 1021–1024. arXiv:0911.3427. Bibcode:2010Natur.464.1021P. doi:10.1038/nature09008. ISSN 1476-4687. PMID 20393558. S2CID 4300790.
- Scarani, Valerio; Acín, Antonio; Ribordy, Grégoire; Gisin, Nicolas (6 February 2004). "Quantum Cryptography Protocols Robust against Photon Number Splitting Attacks for Weak Laser Pulse Implementations". Physical Review Letters. 92 (5) 057901. arXiv:quant-ph/0211131. Bibcode:2004PhRvL..92e7901S. doi:10.1103/PhysRevLett.92.057901. PMID 14995344. S2CID 4791560.
- Scarani, Valerio; Iblisdir, Sofyan; Gisin, Nicolas; Acín, Antonio (8 November 2005). "Quantum cloning". Reviews of Modern Physics. 77 (4): 1225–1256. arXiv:quant-ph/0511088. Bibcode:2005RvMP...77.1225S. doi:10.1103/RevModPhys.77.1225. S2CID 4837756.
- Navascués, Miguel; Pironio, Stefano; Acín, Antonio (8 July 2008). "A convergent hierarchy of semidefinite programs characterizing the set of quantum correlations". New Journal of Physics. 10 (7) 073013. arXiv:0803.4290. Bibcode:2008NJPh...10g3013N. doi:10.1088/1367-2630/10/7/073013. ISSN 1367-2630. S2CID 1906335.
- Ferraro, A.; Aolita, L.; Cavalcanti, D.; Cucchietti, F. M.; Acín, A. (17 May 2010). "Almost all quantum states have nonclassical correlations". Physical Review A. 81 (5) 052318. arXiv:0908.3157. Bibcode:2010PhRvA..81e2318F. doi:10.1103/PhysRevA.81.052318. S2CID 53360929.
- Acín, A.; Bruß, D.; Lewenstein, M.; Sanpera, A. (3 July 2001). "Classification of Mixed Three-Qubit States". Physical Review Letters. 87 (4) 040401. arXiv:quant-ph/0103025. Bibcode:2001PhRvL..87d0401A. doi:10.1103/PhysRevLett.87.040401. PMID 11461603. S2CID 16341709.
- Pironio, Stefano; Acín, Antonio; Brunner, Nicolas; Gisin, Nicolas; Massar, Serge; Scarani, Valerio (30 April 2009). "Device-independent quantum key distribution secure against collective attacks". New Journal of Physics. 11 (4) 045021. arXiv:0903.4460. Bibcode:2009NJPh...11d5021P. doi:10.1088/1367-2630/11/4/045021. ISSN 1367-2630. S2CID 7971771.
- Renou, Marc-Olivier; Trillo, David; Weilenmann, Mirjam; Le, Thinh P.; Tavakoli, Armin; Gisin, Nicolas; Acín, Antonio; Navascués, Miguel (December 2021). "Quantum theory based on real numbers can be experimentally falsified". Nature. 600 (7890). Springer Science and Business Media LLC: 625–629. arXiv:2101.10873. Bibcode:2021Natur.600..625R. doi:10.1038/s41586-021-04160-4. ISSN 1476-4687. PMC 8695381. PMID 34912122.
- Šupić, Ivan; Bowles, Joseph; Renou, Marc-Olivier; Acín, Antonio; Hoban, Matty J. (February 2023). "Quantum networks self-test all entangled states". Nature Physics. 19 (5). Springer Science and Business Media LLC: 670–675. arXiv:2201.05032. Bibcode:2023NatPh..19..670S. doi:10.1038/s41567-023-01945-4. ISSN 1745-2481.

== See also ==
- Tsirelson's bound (Acín's contributions to the problem are mentioned)
- Quantum nonlocality
- Quantum key distribution
- Quantum information
