= Tsirelson's bound =

Theoretical upper limit to non-local correlations in quantum mechanics

A Tsirelson bound is an upper limit to quantum mechanical correlations between distant events. Given that quantum mechanics violates Bell inequalities (i.e., it cannot be described by a local hidden-variable theory), a natural question to ask is how large can the violation be. The answer is precisely the Tsirelson bound for the particular Bell inequality in question. In general, this bound is lower than the bound that would be obtained if more general theories, only constrained by "no-signalling" (i.e., that they do not permit communication faster than light), were considered, and much research has been dedicated to the question of why this is the case.

The Tsirelson bounds are named after Boris S. Tsirelson (or Cirel'son, in a different transliteration) who first derived them.

== Bound for the CHSH inequality ==
The first Tsirelson bound was derived as an upper bound on the correlations measured in the CHSH inequality. It states that if we have four (Hermitian) dichotomic observables $A_0$, $A_1$, $B_0$, $B_1$ (i.e., two observables for Alice and two for Bob) with outcomes $+1, -1$ such that $[A_i, B_j] = 0$ for all $i, j$, then

$$\langle A_0 B_0 \rangle + \langle A_0 B_1 \rangle + \langle A_1 B_0 \rangle - \langle A_1 B_1 \rangle \le 2\sqrt{2}.$$

For comparison, in the classical case (or local realistic case) the upper bound is 2, whereas if any arbitrary assignment of $+1, -1$ is allowed, it is 4. The Tsirelson bound is attained already if Alice and Bob each make measurements on a qubit, the simplest non-trivial quantum system.

Several proofs of this bound exist, but perhaps the most enlightening one is based on the Khalfin–Tsirelson–Landau identity. If we define an observable

$$\mathcal{B} = A_0 B_0  +  A_0 B_1  +  A_1 B_0  -  A_1 B_1,$$

and $A_i^2 = B_j^2 = \mathbb{I}$, i.e., if the observables' outcomes are $+1, -1$, then

$$\mathcal{B}^2 = 4 \mathbb{I} - [A_0, A_1] [B_0, B_1].$$

If $[A_0, A_1] = 0$ or $[B_0, B_1] = 0$, which can be regarded as the classical case, it already follows that $\langle \mathcal{B} \rangle \le 2$. In the quantum case, we need only notice that $\big\|[A_0, A_1]\big\| \le 2 \|A_0\| \|A_1\| \le 2$, and the Tsirelson bound $\langle \mathcal{B} \rangle \le 2\sqrt{2}$ follows.

== Other Bell inequalities ==
Tsirelson also showed that for any bipartite full-correlation Bell inequality with m inputs for Alice and n inputs for Bob, the ratio between the Tsirelson bound and the local bound is at most $K_G^{\mathbb R}(\lfloor r\rfloor),$ where $r = \min \left\{m,n,-\frac12 + \sqrt{\frac14 + 2(m+n)}\right\},$ and $K_G^{\mathbb R}(d)$ is the Grothendieck constant of order d. Note that since $K_G^{\mathbb R}(2) = \sqrt2$, this bound implies the above result about the CHSH inequality.

In general, obtaining a Tsirelson bound for a given Bell inequality is a hard problem that has to be solved on a case-by-case basis. It is not even known to be decidable. The best known computational method for upperbounding it is a convergent hierarchy of semidefinite programs, the NPA hierarchy, that in general does not halt. The exact values are known for a few more Bell inequalities:

For the Braunstein–Caves inequalities we have that

$$\langle \text{BC}_n \rangle \le n \cos\left(\frac{\pi}{n}\right).$$

For the WWŻB inequalities the Tsirelson bound is

$$\langle \text{WWZB}_n \rangle \le 2^{(n-1)/2}.$$

For the $I_{3322}$ inequality the Tsirelson bound is not known exactly, but concrete realisations give a lower bound of 0.250875384514, and the NPA hierarchy gives an upper bound of 0.2508753845139766. It is conjectured that only infinite-dimensional quantum states can reach the Tsirelson bound.

== Derivation from physical principles ==
Significant research has been dedicated to finding a physical principle that explains why quantum correlations go only up to the Tsirelson bound and nothing more. Three such principles have been found: no-advantage for non-local computation, information causality and macroscopic locality. That is to say, if one could achieve a CHSH correlation exceeding Tsirelson's bound, all such principles would be violated. Tsirelson's bound also follows if the Bell experiment admits a strongly positive quantal measure.

== Tsirelson's problem ==
There are two different ways of defining the Tsirelson bound of a Bell expression. One by demanding that the measurements are in a tensor product structure, and another by demanding only that they commute. Tsirelson's problem is the question of whether these two definitions are equivalent. More formally, let

$$B = \sum_{abxy} \mu_{abxy} p(ab\mid xy)$$

be a Bell expression, where $p(ab\mid xy)$ is the probability of obtaining outcomes $a, b$ with the settings $x, y$. The tensor product Tsirelson bound is then the supremum of the value attained in this Bell expression by making measurements $A^a_x : \mathcal{H}_A \to \mathcal{H}_A$ and $B^b_y : \mathcal{H}_B \to \mathcal{H}_B$ on a quantum state $|\psi\rangle \in \mathcal{H}_A \otimes \mathcal{H}_B$:

$$T_t  = \sup_{|\psi\rangle, A^a_x, B^b_y} \sum_{abxy} \mu_{abxy} \langle \psi | A^a_x \otimes B^b_y |\psi\rangle.$$

The commuting Tsirelson bound is the supremum of the value attained in this Bell expression by making measurements $A^a_x : \mathcal{H} \to \mathcal{H}$ and $B^b_y : \mathcal{H} \to \mathcal{H}$ such that $\forall a, b, x, y; [A^a_x, B^b_y] = 0$ on a quantum state $|\psi\rangle \in \mathcal{H}$:

$$T_c  = \sup_{|\psi\rangle, A^a_x, B^b_y} \sum_{abxy} \mu_{abxy} \langle \psi | A^a_x B^b_y |\psi\rangle.$$

Since tensor product algebras in particular commute, $T_t \le T_c$. In finite dimensions commuting algebras are always isomorphic to (direct sums of) tensor product algebras, so only for infinite dimensions it is possible that $T_t \neq T_c$. Tsirelson's problem is the question of whether for all Bell expressions $T_t = T_c$.

This question was first considered by Boris Tsirelson in 1993, where he asserted without proof that $T_t = T_c$. Upon being asked for a proof by Antonio Acín in 2006, he realized that the one he had in mind didn't work, and issued the question as an open problem. Acin, Miguel Navascués, and Stefano Pironio developed a hierarchy of semidefinite programs, generalizing the sum of squares hierarchy to noncommuting variables, that converges to the commuting Tsirelson bound $T_c$ from above, and wanted to know whether it also converged to the tensor product Tsirelson bound $T_t$, the most physically relevant one.

Since one can produce a converging sequencing of approximations to $T_t$ from below by considering finite-dimensional states and observables, if $T_t = T_c$, then this procedure can be combined with the NPA hierarchy to produce a halting algorithm to compute the Tsirelson bound, making it a computable number (note that in isolation neither procedure halts in general). Conversely, if $T_t$ is not computable, then $T_t \neq T_c$. In January 2020, Ji, Natarajan, Vidick, Wright, and Yuen claimed to have proven that $T_t$ is not computable, thus solving Tsirelson's problem in the negative. Tsirelson's problem has been shown to be equivalent to Connes' embedding problem, so the same proof also implies that the Connes embedding problem is false.

== See also ==
- Quantum nonlocality
- Bell's theorem
- EPR paradox
- CHSH inequality
- Quantum pseudo-telepathy
