= Don Fleming =

Donald or Don Fleming may refer to:

- Don Fleming (American football), (1937–1963), American football player
- Don Fleming (musician) (born 1957), American musician and producer
- Donald Fleming (1905–1987), Canadian politician
- Donald S. Fleming (1913–2001), politician from Alberta, Canada
- Donald Fleming (chemist) (born 1938), Canadian chemist
- Donald Harnish Fleming (1923–2008), American historian
