= Information causality =

Information causality is a physical principle suggested in 2009. Information causality states that the information gain a receiver (Bob) can reach about data, previously unknown to him, from a sender (Alice), by using all his local resources and $n$ classical bits communicated by the sender, is at most $n$ bits; and that this limitation should hold even in the case where Alice and Bob pre-share a physical non-signaling resource, such as an entangled quantum state.

The principle assumes classical communication: if quantum bits were allowed to be transmitted, the information gain could be higher (for example if Alice and Bob pre-share some entangled qubits) as demonstrated in the quantum superdense coding protocol.

The principle is respected by all correlations accessible with quantum physics, while it excludes all correlations which violate the quantum Tsirelson bound for the CHSH inequality. However, it does not exclude beyond-quantum correlations in multipartite situations. The principle has also been related to a principle called thermodynamic sufficiency.

== See also ==
- Tsirelson's bound
- Quantum nonlocality
