= KMB09 protocol =

KMB09 protocol (named after Muhammad Mubashir Khan, Michael Murphy and Almut Beige) is an alternative quantum key distribution protocol, where Alice and Bob use two mutually unbiased bases with one of them encoding a '0' and the other one encoding a '1'. The security of the scheme is due to a minimum index transmission error rate (ITER) and quantum bit error rate (QBER) introduced by an eavesdropper. The ITER increases significantly for higher-dimensional photon states. This allows for more noise in the transmission line, thereby increasing the possible distance between Alice and Bob without the need for intermediate nodes.
