= IDQ =

IDQ may refer to:

- International Dairy Queen, a chain of soft serve and fast food restaurants; subsidiary of Berkshire Hathaway
- IDQ (TV station), in Australia
- ID Quantique, a Geneva, Switzerland company which provides quantum key distribution (QKD) systems, single photon counters, and hardware random number generators
