= High-dimensional quantum key distribution =

High-dimensional quantum key distribution (HDQKD) is a technology for secure communication between two parties. It allows for higher information efficiency than traditional binary quantum key distribution (QKD) protocols, which are limited to 1 bit/photon. HDQKD also exhibits higher resilience to noise, enabling lower signal-to-noise ratios and longer transmission distances.

== Implementation ==
One way to implement HDQKD is by using space division multiplexing technology and encoding quantum information in the spatial dimension, such as with optical angular momentum (OAM) modes. While OAM modes have been demonstrated for HDQKD over free-space links, transmission over long-distance fiber links is challenging due to intermodal crosstalk. An alternative approach is to use multicore fibers (MCFs) with separate cores, which offer a large multiplicity of cores and low crosstalk between cores.

However, there are also challenges to implementing HDQKD with MCFs. Manipulating high-dimensional quantum states in MCFs requires precise phase stability, which can be difficult to achieve. In addition, transmitting quantum states through fibers can introduce noise and loss, leading to lower fidelity and higher quantum bit error rates (QBER).

Another promising route for high-dimensional QKD is the use of Hermite–Gaussian (HG) spatial modes, which form a complete orthogonal basis in Cartesian coordinates and can be implemented with standard spatial light modulators. HG modes offer scalable dimensionality and compatibility with both indoor and outdoor free-space transmission. In a recent demonstration, secure key distribution was achieved over distances up to 90 meters, with dimensions up to 16 encoded using HG modes. This spatial-mode-based HDQKD can outperform polarization-based encoding in terms of bits per sifted photon (up to 1.55 BSP for d = 8) and is well-suited to short-range optical wireless links.

== See also ==
- List of quantum key distribution protocols
