= BBM92 protocol =

Quantum protocol without Bell theorem

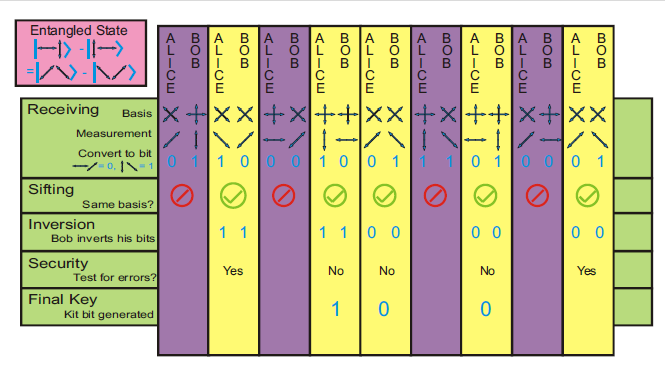
- BBM92 protocol
- Developed by: Charles H Bennett, Gilles Brassard and N David Mermin
- Introduced: February 3, 1992

BBM92 is a quantum key distribution (QKD) protocol named after Charles H. Bennett, Gilles Brassard and N. David Mermin in 1992. The BBM92 is an entanglement based protocol where Alice and Bob measure shared Bell states in complementary (i.e., Z and X) bases. Eve's tampering is tested by checking the correlations in these two bases rather than testing the violation of the Bell inequality, and as such, the security of the BBM92 protocol can only be assured under the condition that measurements in the complementary bases are accurately implemented, meaning that the measurement bases must be precisely aligned. The BBM92 QKD protocol uses a decoy state of multiple photon instead of single photons. The key differences between BBM92 and other well-known QKD protocols, such as the entanglement based E91 protocol and the prepare-and-measure BB84 protocol, is that BBM92 uses only two states instead of four states.

The BBM92 QKD protocol is used for non-orthogonal quantum transmission 0 can be encrypted as 0 degree and 1 as 45 degree in diagonal basis BB92 protocol. There are no eavesdropping secure and hack proof for distance of 200–300 m.
