= Connes embedding problem =

Mathematical problem in von Neumann algebra theory

Connes' embedding problem, formulated by Alain Connes in the 1970s, is a major problem in von Neumann algebra theory. During that time, the problem was reformulated in several different areas of mathematics. Dan Voiculescu developing his free entropy theory found that Connes' embedding problem is related to the existence of microstates. Some results of von Neumann algebra theory can be obtained assuming positive solution to the problem. The problem is connected to some basic questions in quantum theory, which led to the realization that it also has important implications in computer science.

The problem admits a number of equivalent formulations. Notably, it is equivalent to the following long-standing problems:

- Kirchberg's QWEP conjecture in C*-algebra theory
- Tsirelson's problem in quantum information theory
- The predual of any (separable) von Neumann algebra is finitely representable in the trace class.

In January 2020, Ji, Natarajan, Vidick, Wright, and Yuen announced a result in quantum complexity theory that implies a negative answer to Connes' embedding problem. However, an error was discovered in September 2020 in an earlier result they used; a new proof avoiding the earlier result was published as a preprint in September. A broad outline was published in Communications of the ACM in November 2021, and an article explaining the connection between MIP*=RE and the Connes Embedding Problem appeared in October 2022. A Lean formalization of $\mathrm{MIP}^{*}=\mathrm{RE}$ was registered in the Palomar Registry in 2026.

== Statement ==
Let $\omega$ be a free ultrafilter on the natural numbers and let R be the hyperfinite type II_{1} factor with trace $\tau$. One can construct the ultrapower $R^\omega$ as follows: let $l^\infty(R)=\{(x_n)_n\subseteq R:\sup_n||x_n||<\infty\}$ be the von Neumann algebra of norm-bounded sequences and let $I_\omega=\{(x_n)\in l^\infty(R):\lim_{n\rightarrow\omega}\tau(x_n^*x_n)^{\frac{1}{2}}=0\}$. The quotient $R^\omega = l^\infty(R)/I_\omega$ turns out to be a II_{1} factor with trace $\tau_{R^\omega}(x)=\lim_{n\rightarrow\omega}\tau(x_n+I_\omega)$, where $(x_n)_n$ is any representative sequence of $x$.

Connes' embedding problem asks whether every type II_{1} factor on a separable Hilbert space can be embedded into some $R^\omega$.

A positive solution to the problem would imply that invariant subspaces exist for a large class of operators in type II_{1} factors (Uffe Haagerup); all countable discrete groups are hyperlinear. A positive solution to the problem would be implied by equality between free entropy $\chi^*$ and free entropy defined by microstates (Dan Voiculescu). In January 2020, a group of researchers claimed to have resolved the problem in the negative, i.e., there exist type II_{1} von Neumann factors that do not embed in an ultrapower $R^\omega$ of the hyperfinite II_{1} factor.

The isomorphism class of $R^\omega$ is independent of the ultrafilter if and only if the continuum hypothesis is true (Ge-Hadwin and Farah-Hart-Sherman), but such an embedding property does not depend on the ultrafilter because von Neumann algebras acting on separable Hilbert spaces are, roughly speaking, very small.
