= Christian Monyk =

Austrian businessman

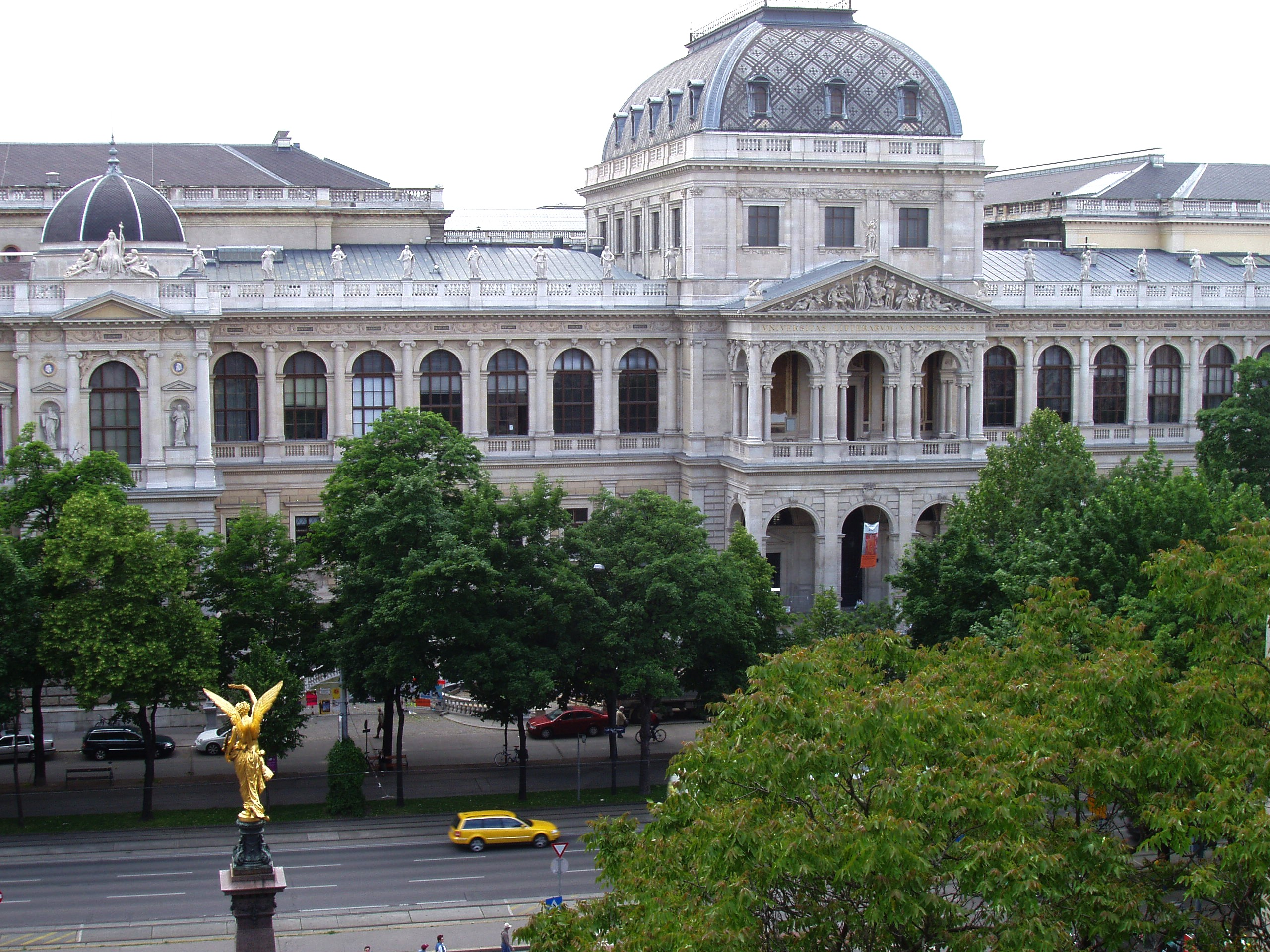
Monyk studied at the University of Vienna.

Christian Monyk is the head of the quantum cryptography business unit of ARC Seibersdorf research GmbH. In addition, he is the overall coordinator of Secure Communication based on Quantum Cryptography.
