= Jenewein =

Jenewein is a surname. Notable people with the surname include:

- Dagmar Belakowitsch-Jenewein (born 1968), Austrian politician
- Felix Jenewein (1857–1905), Czech painter, illustrator and lithographer
- Hans-Jörg Jenewein (born 1974), Austrian politician

== See also ==
- Jennewein
