= Time-bin encoding =

Time-bin encoding is a technique used in quantum information science to encode a qubit of information on a photon. Quantum information science makes use of qubits as a basic resource similar to bits in classical computing. Qubits are any two-level quantum mechanical system; there are many different physical implementations of qubits, one of which is time-bin encoding.

While the time-bin encoding technique is very robust against decoherence, it does not allow easy interaction between the different qubits. As such, it is much more useful in quantum communication (such as quantum teleportation and quantum key distribution) than in quantum computation.

== Construction of a time-bin encoded qubit ==
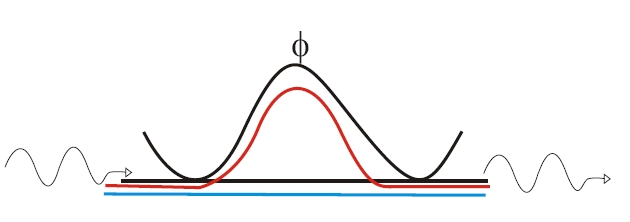

Time-bin encoding is done by having a single-photon go through a Mach–Zehnder interferometer (MZ), shown in black here. The photon coming from the left is guided through one of two paths (shown in blue and red); the guiding can be made by optical fiber or simply in free space using mirrors and polarising cubes. One of the two paths is longer than the other. The difference in path length must be longer than the coherence length of the photon to make sure the path taken can be unambiguously distinguished. The interferometer has to keep a stable phase, which means that the path length difference must vary by much less than the wavelength of light during the experiment. This usually requires active temperature stabilization.

If the photon takes the short path, it is said to be in the state $|0 \rangle$; if it takes the long path, it is said to be in the state $|1 \rangle$. If the photon has a non-zero probability to take either path, then it is in a coherent superposition of the two states:

$$| \psi \rangle = \alpha |0 \rangle + \beta |1 \rangle,$$

These coherent superpositions of the two possible states are called qubits, which are the basic ingredient of Quantum information science.

In general, it is easy to vary the phase gained by the photon between the two paths, for example by stretching the fiber, while it is much more difficult to vary the amplitudes which are therefore fixed, typically at 50%. The created qubit is then

$$| \psi \rangle =  \frac{|0 \rangle +e^{i \phi} |1 \rangle}{\sqrt{2}},$$

which covers only a subset of all possible qubits.

Measurement in the $\{|0 \rangle, |1 \rangle\}$ basis is done by measuring the time of arrival of the photon. Measurement in other bases can be achieved by letting the photon go through a second MZ before measurement, though similar to the state preparation, the possible measurement setups are restricted to only a small subset of possible qubit measurements.

== Decoherence ==
Time-bin qubits do not suffer from depolarization or polarization mode-dispersion, making them better suited to fiber optics applications than polarization encoding. Photon loss is easily detectable since the absence of photons does not correspond to an allowed state, making it better suited than a photon-number based encoding.
