= B92 protocol =

Quantum key distribution protocol - B92

B92 is a quantum key distribution (QKD) protocol developed by Charles Bennett in 1992. It is a simplified alternative to the BB84 protocol, using only two non-orthogonal quantum states rather than four. The protocol relies on the no-cloning theorem and the fundamental principle that non-orthogonal states cannot be perfectly distinguished.

== Overview ==
The B92 protocol is a method of secure quantum key distribution, where a sender (Alice) transmits individual photons to a receiver (Bob). Alice encodes the key using two non-orthogonal quantum states, typically chosen from the Bloch sphere, and Bob measures the received states using a corresponding measurement basis. Due to the non-orthogonality of the states, any eavesdropper (Eve) attempting to intercept the communication will inevitably introduce errors, which Alice and Bob can detect using classical post-processing techniques.

Alice's state	Bob's basis	Measurement outcome	Interpretation	b_{i}
$|0\rangle$	Z	$|0\rangle$	could be $|0\rangle$ or $|+\rangle$ (inconclusive)	discard
$|0\rangle$	Z	$|1\rangle$	orthogonal to $|0\rangle$ ⇒ deduce $|+\rangle$	1
$|0\rangle$	X	$|+\rangle$	could be $|0\rangle$ or $|+\rangle$ (inconclusive)	discard
$|0\rangle$	X	$|-\rangle$	orthogonal to $|+\rangle$ ⇒ deduce $|0\rangle$	0
$|+\rangle$	Z	$|0\rangle$	could be $|0\rangle$ or $|+\rangle$ (inconclusive)	discard
$|+\rangle$	Z	$|1\rangle$	orthogonal to $|0\rangle$ ⇒ deduce $|+\rangle$	1
$|+\rangle$	X	$|+\rangle$	could be $|0\rangle$ or $|+\rangle$ (inconclusive)	discard
$|+\rangle$	X	$|-\rangle$	orthogonal to $|+\rangle$ ⇒ deduce $|0\rangle$	0

Key extraction rule:

$\text{Key} = \{\, a_i \mid b_i = 1 \,\}$

$k_{\text{Alice}} = \{\, a_i \mid b_i = 1 \,\}$

$k_{\text{Bob}} = \{\, a'_i \oplus 1 \mid b_i = 1 \,\}$

== Description ==
In the B92 scheme, Alice chooses a random bit sequence and encodes each bit using one of two non-orthogonal quantum states, such as:

$$|\psi_0\rangle = |0\rangle$$
$$|\psi_1\rangle = \frac{1}{\sqrt{2}} (|0\rangle + |1\rangle)$$

Bob then randomly chooses a measurement basis for each received photon. He can only successfully determine the bit value when his chosen basis allows a conclusive measurement; otherwise, the result is inconclusive and discarded. The final shared key is obtained after Alice and Bob discard inconclusive results and perform classical error correction and privacy amplification.

Recent experimental studies have demonstrated practical implementations of the B92 protocol using pulsed laser sources, offering an accessible alternative for quantum cryptography education and research.

== Security ==
The security of the B92 protocol is based on the fact that non-orthogonal quantum states cannot be perfectly distinguished. If an eavesdropper (Eve) tries to measure the quantum states in transit, she will introduce detectable errors. However, compared to BB84, B92 is more susceptible to certain types of attacks, such as the photon number splitting (PNS) attack in practical implementations using weak coherent pulses. Countermeasures, including decoy states and device-independent QKD techniques, have been proposed to enhance the security of B92-based systems.

== Advantages and limitations ==
=== Advantages ===
- Simpler implementation compared to BB84 due to fewer quantum states.
- Lower hardware complexity as only two quantum states are required.
- Can be adapted for use in various QKD setups, including fiber-based and free-space quantum communication.

=== Limitations ===
- Lower efficiency than BB84, as fewer successful detections occur.
- More vulnerable to practical quantum attacks, such as photon-number-splitting attacks.
- Requires higher detection efficiency to maintain security.

== See also ==
- BB84 protocol
- No-cloning theorem
- E91 protocol
