= Secure Communication based on Quantum Cryptography =

Brief network architecture of SECOQC

Secure Communication based on Quantum Cryptography (SECOQC) is a project that aims to develop quantum cryptography (see there for further details). The European Union decided in 2004 to invest 11 million EUR in the project as a way of circumventing espionage attempts by ECHELON. Christian Monyk, the coordinator of SECOQC, said people and organizations in Austria, Belgium, the United Kingdom, Canada, the Czech Republic, Denmark, France, Germany, Italy, Russia, Sweden, and Switzerland would participate in the project.

On October 8, 2008 SECOQC was launched in Vienna.

== Limitations of classical quantum cryptography ==
Quantum cryptography, usually known as quantum key distribution (QKD) provides powerful security. But it has some limitations. Following no-cloning theorem, QKD only can provide one-to-one connections. So the number of links will increase $N(N-1)/2$ as $N$ represents the number of nodes. If a node wants to participate into the QKD network, it will cause some issues like constructing quantum communication line. To overcome these issues, SECOQC was started.

== Brief architecture of SECOQC network ==
SECOQC network architecture can be divided into two parts: trusted private networks and quantum networks connected via QBBs (quantum backbones). The private networks are conventional networks with end-nodes and a QBB. Each QBB enables quantum channel communication with another QBB and consists of a number of QKD devices that are connected with other QKD devices over one-to-one connections.

From this, SECOQC can provide easier registration of new end-nodes in a QKD network, and quick recovery from threats on quantum channel links.

== See also ==
- Quantum cryptography
