= ID Quantique =

Swiss tech company

Coordinates: 46.1800886°N 6.1353231°E

ID Quantique SA
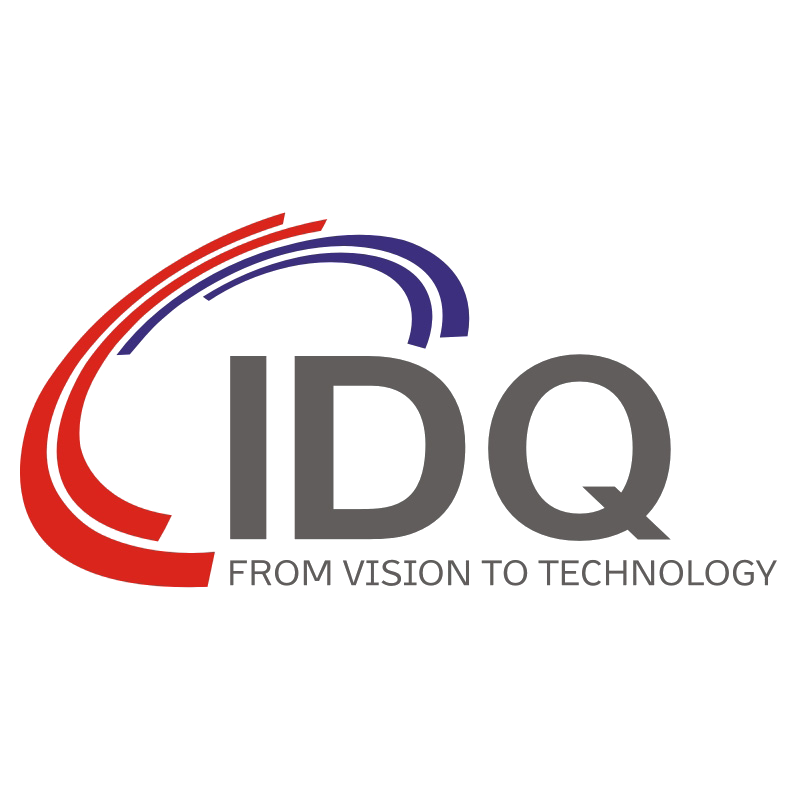
- Type: Private (venture funded)
- Industry: Quantum Cryptography; Random Number Generation; Photon Counting
- Founded: Geneva, Switzerland (2001; 25 years ago)
- Founders: Grégoire Ribordy, Nicolas Gisin, Hugo Zbinden, Olivier Guinnard
- Headquarters: Geneva, GE, Switzerland
- Area served: Worldwide
- Key people: Nicolas Gisin; Grégoire Ribordy; Hugo Zbinden
- Number of employees: 100+ (2021)
- Parent: IonQ (controlling stake since May 2025)
- Website: idquantique.com

ID Quantique (IDQ) is a Swiss company that provides quantum key distribution (QKD) systems, quantum safe network encryption, single photon counters, and hardware random number generators.

Headquartered in Geneva, Switzerland, IDQ was founded in 2001 as a spin-off of the Group of Applied Physics at the University of Geneva. the firm is structured in three business units:

- The quantum safe cryptography division
- The photon counting division
- The quantum random number generation division

In 2025, IonQ announced that it had completed its acquisition of a controlling stake in ID Quantique.

== History ==
The founding team in October 2001 consisted of four University of Geneva physicists: Grégoire Ribordy, Nicolas Gisin, Hugo Zbinden and Olivier Guinnard. Ribordy has been chief executive throughout.

In 2016, South Korea-based SK Telecom invested $2 million in a total of $4 million funding. There was another investment worth KRW 70 billion ($65 million) in February 2018 which reportedly gave the operator majority stake.

In 2019, SK Telecom started employing the ID Quantique random number generators in the subscriber authentication center of the 5G network. The company’s quantum random number generator chip made it to the consumer market in May 2020 in the form of Samsung Galaxy A Quantum. This is a 5G smartphone produced by SK Telecom in South Korea and marketed at that time as the world’s first one.

The purchase of ID Quantique by IonQ was announced in February 2025 and was concluded on 6 May. The purchase took place through the exchange of IonQ stocks for the shares owned by SK Telecom and its investment company SK Square in ID Quantique. Ribordy continued to serve as the CEO of the company, becoming a vice-president of science at IonQ. Niccolo de Masi, the CEO of IonQ, chairs the company’s board of directors. Romania’s national quantum communication infrastructure (RoNaQCI) was launched in February 2026; all its quantum key distribution systems were provided by ID Quantique.

== Divisions ==
=== Quantum Safe Cryptography Division ===
The Quantum Safe Cryptography division focuses on data protection and provides:

- quantum-safe network encryption
- quantum key distribution
- quantum key generation and key management

=== Photon Counting Division ===
The Photon Counting division works on optical instrumentation products such as:

- photon counters in the visible and infrared spectrum
- photon pair sources
- quantum key distribution for R&D applications

== Random Number Generation ==
The company's work in Random Number Generation focuses on developing hardware random number generators based on quantum randomness, for cryptographic and security applications (quantum key generation) and research purposes (MonteCarlo simulations).

== ID Quantique Achievements ==
The company has realized several world premieres in quantum technology innovation.

- In 2004, ID Quantique was one of the first in the world to bring a quantum key distribution system to a commercial market. (MagiQ Technologies, Inc. announced the availability of its quantum key distribution system in 2003.)
- In 2007 quantum cryptography was deployed by a government for the first time ever to protect the Geneva state elections in Switzerland. It is still in deployment.
- In 2010 the company deployed QKD over multiplexed networks with 1 Gbit/s of data, and in 2011 the company ran its QKD systems for over 18 months in the Swissquantum network in cooperation with the University of Geneva.
- In 2014, principles from IDQ together with the University of Geneva, broke the world record for the longest distance key exchange by QKD – 307 km.
- In 2014 IDQ's Quantis true random number generator became the first QRNG to pass the German BSI's AIS31 randomness validation.
- In 2014 ID Quantique and Battelle co-founded the Quantum-Safe Security Working Group in the Cloud Security Alliance (CSA). The group aims to help governments and industry understand quantum‐safe methods for protecting their networks and their data, following the call by the European telecommunications Institute (ETSI) for quantum safe cryptography in their 2014 white paper "Quantum Safe Cryptography and Security".
- ID Quantique also announced their Quantum Random Number Generator (QRNG) chip has been integrated in the 'Vsmart Aris 5G' smartphone made by VinSmart, a member of Vingroup from Vietnam.

== See also ==
- Quantum key distribution
- Quantum cryptography
- Hardware random number generator
