= QuintessenceLabs =

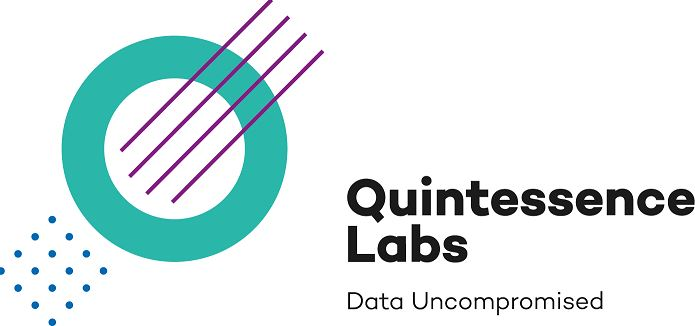
- Company type: Private company
- Industry: Computer security, Internet security, Cybersecurity
- Founded: 2008
- Founders: Vikram Sharma
- Headquarters: Canberra, Australia
- Key people: CEO: Vikram Sharma
- Website: www.quintessencelabs.com

QuintessenceLabs Pty Ltd. (or QuintessenceLabs) is a cybersecurity company headquartered in Canberra, Australia with offices in San Jose, California. QuintessenceLabs produces encryption key and policy management products that conform to the Key Management Interoperability Protocol (KMIP), as well as a hardware random number generator, development of a quantum key distribution (QKD) system, and other encryption solutions that include automatic key zeroization.

The company was founded in 2008 by Dr Vikram Sharma, following research on quantum technology conducted at The Australian National University by Sharma, Thomas Symul, Andrew Lance and Ping Koy Lam.

Westpac Group, a major investor, extended two rounds of funding to QuintessenceLabs in 2015 and 2017, respectively.

In July 2017, QuintessenceLabs received a grant of AU$3.26M from the Australian Department of Defence's Innovation Hub to develop a free-space quantum key distribution system.
