= MagiQ Technologies, Inc. =

MagiQ Technologies, Inc., or MagiQ, is an American technology development company headquartered in Somerville, Massachusetts. Established in 1999, it announced the availability of the world's first commercial quantum key distribution product (Navajo) in 2003. Additional QKD systems (QPN 5505, QPN 7505, and QPN 8505) were released in 2004, 2005 and 2006. Originally developed for the U.S. Navy, MagiQ’s Clear Spectrum Recovery and Agile Interference Mitigation System hardware provide advanced interference cancelation for high-noise RF environments across a wide spectrum of frequencies.

Currently, MagiQ is developing enhanced fiber optical technology to focus on cost-effective, accurate and durable seismic monitoring for energy industry and government customers. Its GeoLite sensor arrays are both more durable and more accurate than traditional multi-component geophones and Distributed Acoustic Sensors. Its government customers include DARPA, the U.S. Navy, NASA, and the U.S. Department of Energy.

== Awards ==
- 2004 Scientific American 50
- IEEE Spectrum “10 Tech Companies for the Next 10 Years” 2004
- World Economic Forum Technology Pioneer 2004

== See also ==
- Quantum key distribution
- Quantum Cryptography
- Seismic array
