= Jim Jennewein (architect) =

American architect

James J. Jennewein (1929 – October 29, 2022) was an architect in Tampa, Florida. He is a fellow at the American Institute of Architects (AIA), past president of the Florida Association of the AIA, past president of the Florida State Board of Architecture, and past president of the Florida Central Chapter of the AIA. He is the son of American sculptor C. Paul Jennewein. He received the National Sculpture Society Medal of Honor. Jennewein was a partner at the firms of McElvy & Jennewein and Ruyle Darby+Jennewein Architects.

Jennewein graduated with an architectural degree from Syracuse University. He did postgraduate work at Stuttgart University as a Fulbright Scholar.

Jennewein moved with his family to Tampa in the 1960s. He was the architect for the David A. Straz, Jr. Center for the Performing Arts. Jennewien has been a member of Tampa's Chamber of Commerce (and past chairman of the Cultural Affairs Committee), the Tampa/Hillsborough Arts Council, past president of the Tampa Bay Arts Center, served on the board of directors of the Tampa Museum of Art (and was president of the board in 1986); was a board director and past vice president of the National Sculpture Society; and a retired trustee of Brookgreen Gardens in South Carolina.

James J. Jennewein, architect of McElvy and Jennewein, and Robert J. Dean of Dean Redman and Parks were responsible for the layout and interior design of the City Club of Tampa's new club quarters.
