= Donald Fleming (chemist) =

Canadian chemist

- Born: November 7, 1938 (age 87); Canada
- Education: University of British Columbia, University of California, Berkeley
- Scientific career
- Fields: Chemistry
- Workplaces: University of British Columbia

Donald George Fleming (born November 7, 1938) is a Canadian chemist. He attended the University of British Columbia and earned a Bachelor of Science degree in 1961 and a Master of Science degree in 1961. He earned a Ph.D. at the University of California, Berkeley in 1967. He is currently a professor emeritus of chemistry at the University of British Columbia. In 1989 he published a paper theorizing a new kind of chemical bond, which he referred to as vibrational bonding. The existence of such a short-lived bond was confirmed using a reaction between bromine and the exotic atom muonium in January 2015. Fleming is also known for his work in utilizing muon beams in studies of physical chemical sciences.
