= Thomas Jennewein =

Austrian physicist

- Education: HTBLVA Innsbruck Anichstraße; University of Innsbruck; University of Vienna
- Known for: Tests of fundamental quantum mechanical concepts, such as Bell's inequality and local realism.; Work on quantum communication and free space quantum key distribution.
- Awards: Loschmidt-Prize of the Austrian Physical-Chemical Society (2002); International ARC Research Fellowship, Australian Research Council (2007); Wilhelm Exner Medal (2018)
- Scientific career
- Fields: Quantum key distribution, Quantum optics
- Workplaces: University of Waterloo; Institute for Quantum Computing
- Thesis: Quantum Communication and Teleportation Experiments using Entangled Photon Pairs (2002)

Thomas Jennewein is an Austrian physicist who conducts research in quantum communication and quantum key distribution. He has taught as an associate professor at the University of Waterloo and the Institute for Quantum Computing in Waterloo, Canada since 2009. He earned his PhD under Anton Zeilinger at the University of Vienna in 2002, during which time he performed experiments on Bell's inequality and cryptography with entangled photons. His current work at the Institute for Quantum Computing focuses on satellite-based free space quantum key distribution, with the goal of creating a global quantum network.

He is also an affiliate of the Perimeter Institute for Theoretical Physics, a fellow of the Canadian Institute for Advanced Research, and CEO and co-founder of quantum optics measurement device company UQDevices alongside physicist Raymond Laflamme.

== Education and earlier work ==
Thomas Jennewein obtained an engineering degree in physics from HTL Anichstraße in 1991, his master's degree in experimental physics from the University of Innsbruck in 1997, and earned his doctoral degree at the University of Vienna in 2002. He then worked as a postdoctoral fellow at the Institute for Quantum Optics and Quantum Information within the Austrian Academy of Sciences from 2004 until 2009 and as a visiting research fellow at the University of Queensland from 2007 to 2008.

== Current work ==
Since 2009, Jennewein has held an associate professorship position at the University of Waterloo and Institute for Quantum Computing where he is the leader of the Quantum Photonics Laboratory. He is currently "working with partners in industry and academia to advance a proposed microsatellite mission called QEYSSat through a series of technical studies funded initially by Defence Research and Development Canada (DRDC) and subsequently by the Canadian Space Agency (CSA)." In April 2017, the Canadian government announced funding of $80.9 million to the Canadian Space Agency for funding of two projects, one of which is for the "demonstration of the applications of quantum technology in space" with the goal of positioning "Canada as a leader in quantum encryption".

In December 2015, Jennewein, with researchers from the National Institute of Standards and Technology, the Joint Quantum Institute at the University of Maryland, and the Jet Propulsion Laboratory at the California Institute of Technology among others, closed two loopholes (namely, the locality and detection loopholes) in a Bell test experiment by using entangled photons to obtain a Bell inequality violation by seven standard deviations.

In April 2017, Jennewein and researchers from the Institute for Quantum Computing, the University of Innsbruck, the University of Paderborn, and the University of Moncton experimentally observed "three-photon interference that does not originate from two-photon or single photon interference" by following a "theoretical recipe proposed by Daniel Greenberger, Michael Horne, and Anton Zeilinger in 1993". The experiment later received one of the ten Physics World 2017 Breakthrough of the Year awards.

In June 2017, Jennewein and his colleagues published findings that showed the first demonstration of quantum key distribution from a ground transmitter to a "receiver prototype mounted on an airplane in flight", reporting optical links with distances between 3-10km and the generation of secure keys up to 868 kilobytes in length.
