= Vibrational bond =

A vibrational bond is a chemical bond that happens between two very large atoms, like bromine, and a very small atom, like hydrogen, at very high energy states. Vibrational bonds only exist for a few milliseconds. This bond is detectable through modern analytic chemistry and is significant because it affects the rate at which other reactions can occur.

== History ==
Vibrational bonds were mathematically predicted almost thirty years before they were experimentally observed. The original theoretical calculations had been carried out by D.C. Clary and J.N.L Connor during the early 1980s. Together they hypothesized that with very large atoms and small atoms at high energy states, the elements would stabilize and create temporary bonds for very short periods of time. The vibrational bond would be weaker than any currently known bond, like the commonly known ionic or covalent bonds.

One year after the theoretical discovery of vibrational bonds, J. Manz and his team confirmed the calculations that were previously made, and elaborated on them by showing that the vibrational bonds were most likely to occur during symmetric reactions, but stated that vibrational bonds may also be possible with asymmetric reactions. Their team explained that although vibrational bonding theories proved to be correct they found some inconsistencies with the 'classic model' and found that symmetric reactions will show resonance, but only in certain transition states. However, the classic model would still be viable to use to predict vibrational bonds.

In 1989, Donald Fleming noticed that a reaction between bromine and muonium slowed down as temperature increased. This phenomenon was known as a "vibrational bond" and would capture the attention of Donald Fleming again in 2014. In 1989 the technology did not exist to collect sufficient data on the reaction, and Donald Fleming and his team moved away from the research.

== Discovery ==
Donald Fleming and his team recently began their investigation of vibrational bonds, and as they had expected from the results of their experiments in 1989, the BrLBr reaction slowed at high temperatures, now using modern instrumental analysis from photo detachment electron spectroscopy, the vibrational bond was detected but lasted only a few milliseconds. The vibrational bond acted differently than van der Waals forces reactions because the energy was balanced differently.

== Bond ==
In chemistry it is known that increased temperature increases the rate or reaction of an experiment, however vibrational bonds are not formed like covalent bonds where electrons are shared between the two bonding atoms. Vibrational bonds are created at high energy where the muonium bounces to and from bromine atoms "like a ping pong ball bouncing between two bowling balls," according to Donald Fleming. This bouncing action lowers the potential energy of the BrMuBr molecule, and therefore slows the rate of the reaction.

This type of bond has been confirmed in the BrMuBr molecules but in the heavier isotopes of hydrogen (protium, deuterium, and tritium), the vibrational bonding can only occur as the van der Waals forces are overcome and the vibrational bond is formed.

== Relevance ==
This discovery changes the understanding of chemical bonds, with van der Waals interactions, and recently discovered vibrational bonding will show that there are different mechanisms and energies for different bonds, and the experimental discovery of the vibrational bonding has the potential to encourage more research in isotopic interactions.
