= QSS =

QSS may refer to:

- Quantum Secret Sharing, a quantum cryptographic scheme for secure communication
- Queensway Secondary School, a co-educational government secondary school in Queenstown, Singapore
- QSS, the station code for Qila Sattar Shah railway station, Sheikhupura District, Pakistan
