= PUFS =

PUFS may refer to:

== University ==
- Pusan University of Foreign Studies, in Busan, South Korea
- Pyongyang University of Foreign Studies, in Pyongyang, North Korea

== Other ==
- Peer Union File System
- Physical Unclonable Functions
- Pinups for Soldiers, Georgia, United States
