= Mohamed Bourennane =

Algerian physicist (born 1962)

- Born: May 2, 1962 (age 64); Laghouat, Laghouat Province, French Algeria
- Education: USTHB (BSc, MSc); KTH Royal Institute of Technology (PhD)
- Scientific career
- Fields: Quantum Information, Quantum Optics
- Institutions: Max Planck Institute of Quantum Optics; Stockholm University
- Thesis: Long wavelength quantum cryptography, single-photon detection, and quantum entanglement applications (2001)
- Doctoral advisor: Anders Karlsson

Mohamed Bourennane (Arabic: محمد بورنان, born 2 May 1962) is an Algerian-Swedish physicist noted for both his theoretical and experimental work on quantum communication and multi-photon entanglement. Bourennane is a professor at Stockholm University and an elected member of the Royal Swedish Academy of Sciences since 2014.

== Education ==
Mohamed Bourennane came from a working class background, his father was a track driver. Bourennane attended the Al-Ghazali high school in Laghouat, concluding his baccalaureate in science in 1981. Later, Bourennane attended the University of Science and Technology - Houari Boumediene (USTHB), obtaining a Diplôme d'Études Supérieures (DES) in 1985 and a Magister degree in 1988, both in Theoretical Physics. He was awarded his PhD in 2001 by the Royal Institute of Technology, in Stockholm, Sweden. Afterward, Bourennane worked as a postdoctoral researcher at LMU Munich, in Munich, and the Max Planck Institute for Quantum Optics, in Garching, both in Germany.

== Research ==
Bourennane has made contributions for the fields of quantum communication, and multi-photon entanglement being better known for his contributions to quantum key distribution using multi-level quantum systems. He has published over 170 articles across the fields of quantum information, quantum optics and foundations of quantum physics. Currently, he directs the Quantum Information and Quantum Optics group at Stockholm University, which he founded in February 2005.

Some of Bourennane's most important contributions include the first experimental detection of genuine multipartite entanglement via witness operators, the first experimental device-independent tests of classical and quantum dimensions and measurement-device-independent entanglement witnessing.

He is currently part of the National Quantum Communication Infrasctructure in Sweden (NQCIS), a consortium working to establish a quantum communication network in the country..

Since 2014, he is an elected member of the Royal Swedish Academy of Sciences

=== Awards ===
- Member of the Royal Swedish Academy of Sciences from 2014.
- Awarded the Algerian Scholar Award in 2024.
