= Claude Crépeau =

Canadian computer scientist

Claude Crépeau is a professor in the School of Computer Science at McGill University. Ηe was born in Montreal, Quebec, Canada, in 1962. He received a master's degree from the Université de Montréal in 1986, and obtained his Ph.D. in Computer Science from MIT in 1990, working in the field of cryptography with Silvio Micali as his Ph.D. advisor and Gilles Brassard as his M.Sc advisor. He spent two years as a Postdoctoral Fellow at Université d'Orsay, and was a CNRS researcher at École Normale Supérieure from 1992 to 1995. He was appointed associate professor at Université de Montréal in 1995, and has been a faculty member at McGill University since 1998. He was a member of the Canadian Institute for Advanced Research program on Quantum Information Processing from 2002 to 2012.

Crépeau is best known for his fundamental work in zero-knowledge proof, multi-party computing, quantum cryptography, and quantum teleportation.

In 1993, together with Charles H. Bennett, Gilles Brassard, Richard Jozsa, Asher Peres, and William Wootters, Crépeau invented quantum teleportation.

== Publications ==
- Bennett, Charles H.; Brassard, Gilles; Crépeau, Claude; Jozsa, Richard; Peres, Asher; Wootters, William K. (1993-03-29). "Teleporting an unknown quantum state via dual classical and Einstein-Podolsky-Rosen channels". Physical Review Letters. 70 (13). American Physical Society (APS): 1895–1899. Bibcode:1993PhRvL..70.1895B. doi:10.1103/physrevlett.70.1895. ISSN 0031-9007. PMID 10053414.
