= Stephen Wiesner =

American-Israeli research physicist (1942–2021)

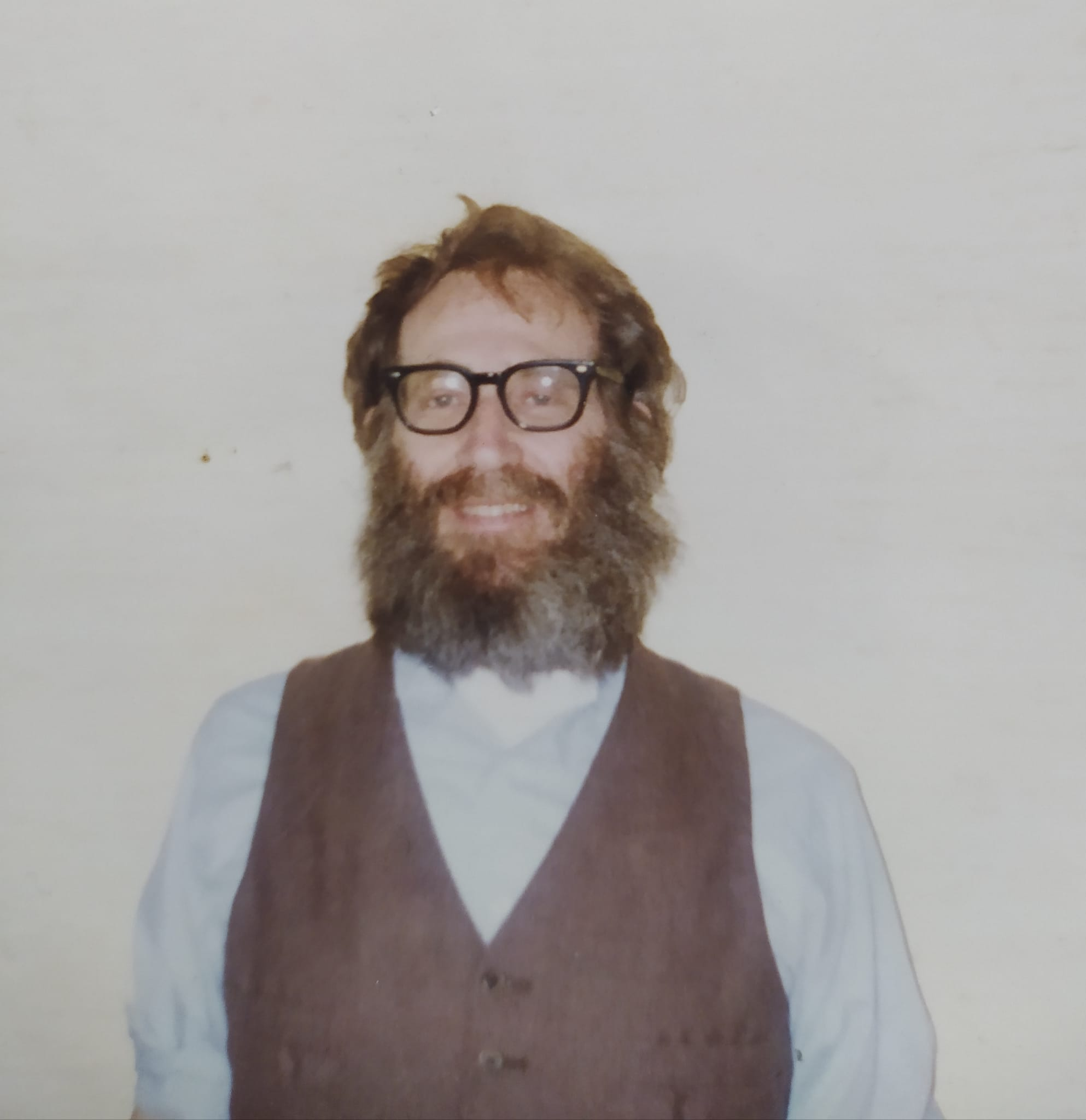
- Wiesner in 1988
- Born: 1942; US
- Died: August 12, 2021 (aged 78–79); Jerusalem
- Citizenship: US, Israel
- Education: Brandeis University
- Alma mater: Columbia University
- Known for: Quantum information theory; superdense coding; quantum money; quantum multiplexing
- Notable work: Conjugate Coding, 1983 (published)
- Parent(s): Jerome Wiesner, Laya Wiesner
- Awards: Rank Prize (2006) Micius Quantum Prize (2019)
- Scientific career
- Fields: quantum information
- Thesis: Experimental test of the rotational invariance of the weak interaction (1972)

Stephen J. Wiesner (1942 – August 12, 2021) was an American-Israeli research physicist, inventor and construction laborer. As a graduate student at Columbia University in New York in the late 1960s and early 1970s, he discovered several of the most important ideas in quantum information theory, including quantum money (which led to quantum key distribution), quantum multiplexing (the earliest example of oblivious transfer) and superdense coding (the first and most basic example of entanglement-assisted communication). Although this work remained unpublished for over a decade, it circulated widely enough in manuscript form to stimulate the emergence of quantum information science in the 1980s and 1990s.

Stephen Wiesner is the son of Jerome Wiesner and Laya Wiesner. He received his undergraduate degree from Brandeis University. In the 1970s, after leaving academia, he worked in many different Silicon Valley startups while also working on weekends at a fruits and vegetable distribution co-op. During this time he became interested in Judaism and in finding solutions for solar energy, clean energy and space migration.

After moving to Israel, in addition to his religious study, Wiesner worked part time in construction and as a surveyor. He continued to work constantly on inventions, ideas and prototypes, mostly related to clean energy, sustainability and space travel. He remained affiliated with the Quantum Foundations & Information Group at Tel Aviv University.

In 2006 he shared the Rank Prize in Optoelectronics with Charles H. Bennett and Gilles Brassard for quantum cryptography. In 2019, he received one of six Micius Quantum Prizes, along with Bennett, Brassard, Artur Ekert, Anton Zeilinger and Pan Jianwei, for quantum communication.
