= Lu Chao-Yang =

Chinese quantum physicist

- 陆朝阳
- Born: 1982 (age 43–44); Zhejiang, China
- Education: University of Science and Technology of China; University of Cambridge
- Known for: Jiuzhang quantum computer Multiphoton entanglement
- Awards: Fresnel Prize (2017); Adolph Lomb Medal (2020); APS Landauer–Bennett Award (2021)
- Scientific career
- Workplaces: University of Science and Technology of China
- Thesis: Quantum dot resonance fluorescence and spin dynamics (2011)
- Doctoral advisor: Mete Atatüre
- Other academic advisors: Pan Jianwei
- Website: staff.ustc.edu.cn/~cylu/

Lu Chao-Yang (born 1982) is a Chinese physicist whose work focuses on quantum technology. Described as "a wizard of entangled photons" by Nobel laureate Anton Zeilinger, Lu is also known for his work on quantum teleportation, including co-leading the development of the Jiuzhang photonic quantum computer with his frequent collaborator Pan Jianwei.

== Early life and education ==
Born in China's Zhejiang province in 1982, Lu grew up in a rural part of Jinhua and attended Dongyang High School. He decided to study physics at the University of Science and Technology of China (USTC) after hearing a lecture by Pan Jianwei about quantum teleportation.

Lu began working with Pan during his third undergraduate year at USTC, after the two met at a dinner party. Describing the landscape for his early work with Pan, Lu told an interviewer, "Quantum technology was far less hot then, and we had much less funding. Our motivation was not so ambitious as to build a practical quantum computer but to investigate fundamental questions in quantum technology."

Encouraged by Pan to study abroad, in 2008 Lu left USTC (after earning a master's degree there) for the University of Cambridge. At Cambridge, his focus shifted from manipulating photons to creating reliable sources of research-grade single photons.

In 2011, after earning his Ph.D from Cambridge, Lu returned to USTC as a professor. He was part of the first cohort of China's Thousand Talents Program for Young People, a talent recruitment program aimed at bringing young researchers to China.

== Multiphoton entanglement ==
Science is step by step. First, you make the impossible thing possible. Then you work to make it more perfect. — Lu Chao-Yang, Scientific American, August 14, 2019

Quantum entanglement is one of the strangest prediction of quantum physics; Einstein called it dismissively "spooky action at a distance" (spukhafte Fernwirkung). Quantum particles are said to be entangled when their properties are so completely correlated that, even if the particles are far apart, measuring one gives information about its entangled partners.

During his early years at USTC, Lu focused on entangled photons. For example, he used four entangled photons to demonstrate Shor's factoring algorithm and in 2007 led the first team to entangle six photons. Anton Zeilinger, whose work on photon entanglement won the 2022 Nobel Prize in Physics, has called Lu "a wizard of entangled photons."

Quantum teleportation uses entangled photons to transmit quantum properties across long distances. Already in 1997, scientists teleported a single quantum property, but not until 2015 were Lu and Pan able to teleport two quantum properties simultaneously, an achievement called "herculean" by Physics World, which recognized it as 2015's "Breakthrough of the Year."

To teleport two properties required hyper-entangling two photons; to teleport three properties would require controlling ten photons. By 2019, Lu and Pan could control 20 indistinguishable photons, described in Physics as "a milestone in the field of quantum computing."

Lu was closely involved in the project that designed and launched China's Micius Satellite. The satellite, launched in 2017, uses entangled photons to enable quantum key distribution over global distances. The satellite is also used for quantum experiments in space.

== Single-photon sources ==
Quantum computing, when done with photons as "qubits," requires reliable single-photon sources. The ideal is "an on-demand, deterministic, single-photon source delivering light pulses in a well-defined polarization and spatiotemporal mode, and containing exactly one photon."

During his graduate-school years at Cambridge, Lu worked on developing quantum dots as single-photon sources, using resonance fluorescence to generate spin-selective photons. When he returned to USTC in 2011, he set up a new laboratory to work with such solid-state quantum light sources. Much of that work focused on improving the reliability and output of single photons generated by quantum dots.

To improve the efficiency of single-photo generation, Lu's team has done much work to reduce photon loss. One 2019 paper, described in Nature Photonics as "groundbreaking research" and "a milestone achievement...a single-photon source that emits polarized single photons with an efficiency of greater than 50%, while approaching near-unity indistinguishability."

In 2020, Lu was working to improve the scalability of quantum-dot photon sources to use them on boson-sampling for quantum computing.

In 2025, Lu's team achieved a milestone in dealing with photon loss, bringing it below the desired threshold.

== Jiuzhang photonic computer ==
Jiuzhang (Chinese: 九章) is the first photon-based quantum computer to claim quantum supremacy -- in other words, it is a quantum computer able to solve a problem that no classical computer can solve in a reasonable amount of time. Previously quantum supremacy has been achieved only once, in 2019, by Google's Sycamore. Google's computer, however, was based on superconducting materials, and not photons. Describing the difference between Jiuzhang and Google's Sycamore, Scientific American explained, "Sycamore uses superconducting loops of metal to form qubits; in Jiŭzhāng, the photons themselves are the qubits."

In 2020, a team of Chinese authors led by Lu together with Pan Jianwei reported achieving quantum supremacy with their photonic quantum computer, which they had named "Jiuzhang" for an ancient mathematical text. Describing their results, Philip Ball in Nature reported that the team "could find solutions to the boson-sampling problem in 200 seconds. They estimate these would take 2.5 billion years to calculate on China’s TaihuLight supercomputer — a quantum advantage of around 10^14."

After 2020, Pan and Lu continued to improve the Jiuzhang setup and performance. In 2026, according to the South China Morning Post, USTC scientists reported that their current version Jiuzhang 4.0 "completed a Gaussian boson sampling task in just 25 microseconds – a calculation they estimated would take the world’s most powerful supercomputer, El Capitan in the United States, more than 10^42 years to finish."

Lu has chided colleagues for "overhyping" quantum computers, comparing the problem of controlling qubits to trying to make 10 kittens stand in a line. China Daily quotes him as saying, "Building a quantum computer is a race between humans and nature, not between countries."

== Recognition ==
- 2015 Physics World Breakthrough of the Year Prize (with Pan Jianwei) for "being the first to achieve the simultaneous quantum teleportation of two inherent properties of a fundamental particle – the photon."
- 2017 Fresnel Prize (European Physical Society) for "outstanding achievement in quantum light sources, quantum teleportation and optical quantum computing"
- 2018 Newcomb Cleveland Prize from the American Association for the Advancement of Science as coauthor of the previous year's outstanding scientific paper published in Science, "Satellite-based entanglement distribution over 1200 kilometers"
- 2020 Adolph Lomb Medal for "significant contributions to optical quantum information technologies, especially on high-performance single-photon sources, quantum teleportation and optical quantum computing"
- 2021 APS Rolf Landauer and Charles H. Bennett Award in Quantum Computing for "significant contributions to optical quantum information sciences, especially on solid-state quantum light sources, quantum teleportation, and optical quantum computing."
- 2021 James P. Gordon Memorial Speakership honoring 2020 paper "Quantum Computational Advantage Using Photons"
- 2026 Quantum Electronics Award of the IEEE Photonics Society "For pioneering work on single photon sources and optical quantum computing"
