= Atominstitute =

Austrian University nuclear physics research facility

Coordinates: 48.196664°N 16.412780°E

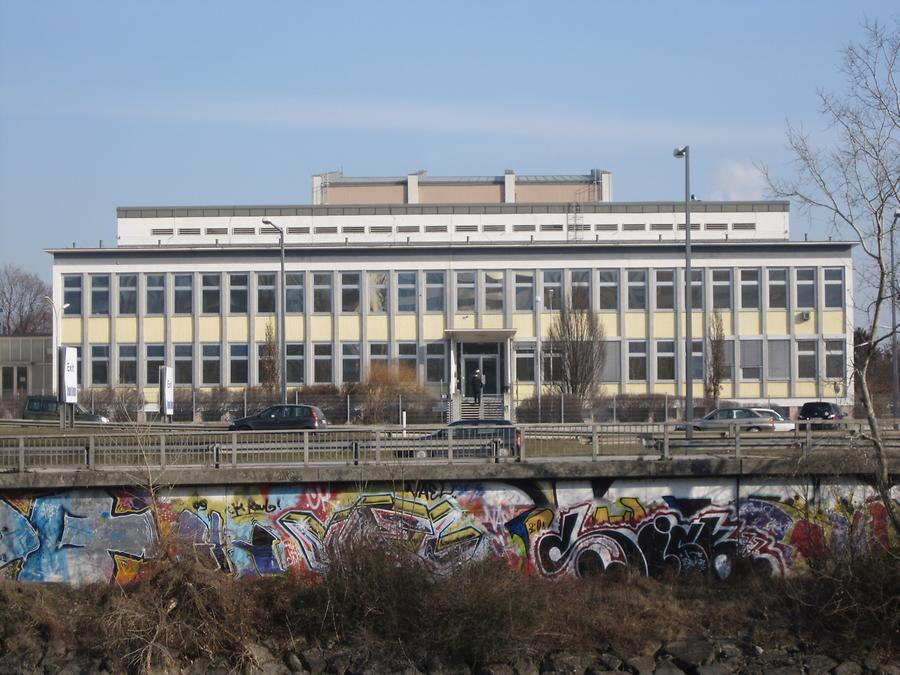
The Atominstitute

The Atominstitute (German: Atominstitut) is an Austrian University research facility with its own inhouse nuclear reactor located in Vienna. The institute most known member is 2022 Nobel laureate Anton Zeilinger.

Additional to the academic activities, the inspectors of the International Atomic Energy Agency (IAEA), headquartered nearby in Vienna, use the reactor for training and education, before being sent to deployment sites worldwide. These nuclear facilities include those in warzones like the Nuclear program of Iran, and nuclear power stations in Ukraine, e.g. (Zaporizhia).

== History and location ==
In the 1950s, the institute was founded as common nuclear physics research facility of the Austrian Universities. With its nuclear research reactor, which was officially commissioned in 1962, it is today the only facility remaining in Austria that has a running nuclear fission reactor.

As in 2025 the official name of the institute in English is "Institute of Atomic and Subatomic Physics". However internationally the easier to remember name of Atomic Institute, or Atominstitute is more widespread in use. Administratively it is part of Vienna University of Technology (TU Wien) and, together with the Institutes of Theoretical, Applied and Solid State Physics, forms the Faculty of Physics of this university.

Unusual for a nuclear reactor, the institute is located within the densely populated 2nd district of Vienna, Leopoldstadt, less than 3 km from the city center. It boards the most popular large recreational park of Vienna, the Prater, and the most western branch of the Danube stream, the Donaukanal.

== Current routine activity at nuclear reactor and cooperation with IAEA ==
A central inhouse facility is the TRIGA Mark II research reactor. It is used for University teaching, together with other research infrastructure, at the institute. The instate allows for practical education in the handling and work with radioactive materials and ionizing radiation. In addition to research and teaching in the fields of reactor physics, radiation protection, radiopharmaceuticals, radiochemistry and archaeometry, the area of reactor operation management is covered also. This includes organisation and practice in radiation protection, security and nuclear safety.

The know-how in nuclear management methods is fruitful for the routine cooperation with the International Atomic Energy Agency (IAEA), headquartered at the UNO City located at the main branch of the Danube, only few kilometers away. The reactor allows for the theoretical and practical training of international IQEA experts in live radiation fields. These experts serve then as inspectors for nuclear programmes and facilities worldwide within the United Nations framework of the non-proliferations of nuclear weapons (NPT).

Additionally, the reactor is used for education at the college level on nuclear physics also. Over 1.000 undergraduate students visit the facility in guided tours annually.

== Research fields at the institute ==
Besides radiation and nucleides the institute has a strong quantum physics research focus. Thus the specific research groups cover:

- Cold Molecules and Quantum Technologies
- Solid-state quantum optics and nanophotonics
- Atomic Physics and Quantum Optics
- Experimental Quantum Information
- Atomic Interferometry
- Nuclear and Particle Physics
- Neutron- and Quantum Physics
- Radiation Physics
- Medical Radiation Physics
- Low Temperature Physics and Superconductivity
- Quantum Metrology
- Quantum Optics and Quantum Information

== Notable members ==
Nobel laureate 2022 in physics, Anton Zeilinger, a quantum physicist, started as student in the 1970 at the institute. Later on he was researcher, assistant, and is now emeritus.

- Gustav Ortner – founder
- Fritz Regler – cofounder
- Heinz Oberhummer – astrophysicist and science cabaret performer
- Jörg Schmiedmayer – quantum physicist
- Helmut Rauch – quantum physicist, doctoral supervisor of Anton Zeilinger

== Recent research and publications of general notable physics interest ==
Findings, resulting from combining atomistic (quantum) with continuous (classical) physics reasoning, go remarkably beyond nuclear and quantum research at the institute. Classical physics concepts applied encompass Thermodynamics (e.g. Heat dissipation), and Hydrodynamics (e.g. waves behaviour). The new combinations are derived by advanced mathematical computer modelling and innovative measurements at the institute. Recent examples are:

=== 2025 ===
F. Meier et al., combined applied measurements with analogue experiments for quantum physics, to publish the Emergence of a Second Law of Thermodynamics in Isolated Quantum Systems: "In quantum physics, you often come across very complicated equations. When a large number of particles are involved, even the world's largest supercomputers are hopelessly overwhelmed," according to a member of the research group.

J. Schmiedmayer and his team, received a prestigious European Research Council Advanced Grant for his studies in Emergent Quantum Mechanics: "Actually, the formulas of fluid mechanics describe a homogeneous flow in which individual particles play no role. But surprisingly, these formulas can also be used to describe aspects of the quantum world better than one can from a naive point of view would be expected".

== Further links ==
- ATI
- Trigacenter
- Advancing Education About Nuclear Law and Science in Arab Countries
