= Institute of Advanced Technology =

Research institute located in Hefei, Anhui, China

- Simplified Chinese: 中国科学技术大学先进技术研究院
- Traditional Chinese: 中國科學技術大學先進技術研究院
Transcriptions
Standard Mandarin
- Hanyu Pinyin: Zhōngguó Kēxué Jìshù Dàxué Xiānjìn Jìshù Yánjiūyuàn

Alternative Chinese name
- Chinese: 中科大先研院
Transcriptions
Standard Mandarin
- Hanyu Pinyin: ZhōngKēDà XiānYánYuàn

The Institute of Advanced Technology, University of Science and Technology of China (IAT USTC; Chinese: 中国科学技术大学先进技术研究院) is a research institute affiliated with the University of Science and Technology of China (USTC) and located in Hefei, Anhui, China. It was jointly founded by the Anhui provincial government, the Chinese Academy of Sciences, the Hefei municipal government, and USTC in 2012.

== Research projects ==
=== Quantum Communication Satellite ===
Quantum Communication Satellite's main function is sending entangled photon to all world, for achieving fully classified communication.

Pan Jianwei, Professor of University of Science and Technology of China published a scientific article stating their first space quantum communication experiment on 4, June, 2013. The experiment was finished in 2010 or before using a Germany satellite CHAMP launched in July, 2000. The satellite was out of orbit in September, 2010. On 2011, Pan's project was approved by Chinese Academy of Sciences.

=== Quantum Communication Beijing-Shanghai Route ===
On January 12, 2014, China decided to build Quantum Communication Beijing-Shanghai Route.
