= SAGA (satellite) =

European quantum communication satellite

- Mission type: Technology demonstration
- Operator: European Union; European Space Agency

Spacecraft properties
- Manufacturer: Thales Alenia Space

SAGA (Security And cryptoGrAphic) is a future European technology demonstration satellite for in-orbit demonstration of space-based quantum key distribution (QKD) for secure communications. The mission is funded by ESA's Advanced Research in Telecommunications Systems (ARTES) programme and its prime contractor is Thales Alenia Space. Unlike another QKD satelllite by ESA called Eagle-1, SAGA focuses mostly on institutional services and is designed to support classified data transmissions. SAGA is part of the EU's European Quantum Communication Infrastructure (EuroQCI).

== See also ==
- List of European Space Agency programmes and missions
- Eagle-1 – European quantum communication satellite
- QUBE-II – German technology demonstration satellite
- Quantum Experiments at Space Scale – Chinese quantum research satellite
