= QUBE-II =

German technology demonstration satellite

- Mission type: Quantum key distribution
- Operator: (Germany) BMFTR
- COSPAR ID: 2026-100C
- SATCAT no.: 69023

Spacecraft properties
- Bus: 8U CubeSat

Start of mission
- Launch date: 3 May 2026, 7:00 UTC
- Rocket: Falcon 9 CAS500-2 rideshare mission

QUBE-II is a German technology demonstration satellite developed for the Federal Ministry of Research, Technology and Space based on an 8U CubeSat bus by the Lithuanian company NanoAvionics. The mission's goal is to demonstrate quantum key exchange between a small satellite and a ground station. The satellite includes a 2.5U Laser Communication Terminal (LCT) based on instruments flown on precursor missions CubeISL (launched in 2021) and QUBE-I (2024). The mission's consortium was led by OHB and included DLR, FAU, LMU, and ZFT. QUBE-II was launched on 3 May 2026 on the Falcon 9's CAS500-2 rideshare mission.

== See also ==
- Eagle-1 – European quantum communication satellite
- SAGA (satellite) – European quantum communication satellite
- Quantum Experiments at Space Scale – Chinese quantum research satellite
