= TRIGA =

Class of nuclear reactor used for education and research

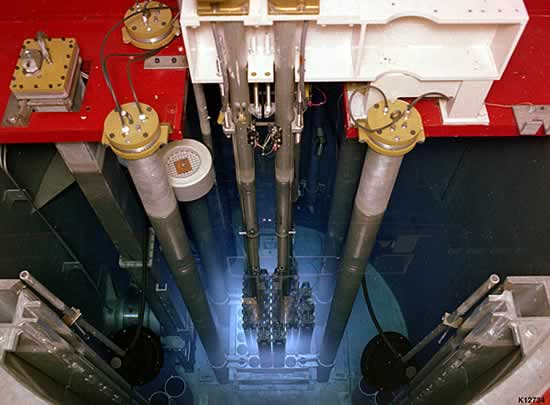
Picture of a TRIGA reactor core. The blue glow is caused by Cherenkov radiation.

TRIGA (Training, Research, Isotopes, General Atomics) is a class of nuclear research reactor designed and manufactured by General Atomics. The design team for TRIGA, which included Edward Teller, was led by the physicist Freeman Dyson. Multiple variants of the reactor have been built, with a total of 66 having been installed across 24 different countries. The reactors have constant thermal power outputs ranging from 0.1-16 MW and can be pulsed to 22,000 MW.

== Design ==
TRIGA is a swimming pool reactor that can be installed without a containment building, and is designed for research and testing use by scientific institutions and universities for purposes such as undergraduate and graduate education, private commercial research, non-destructive testing and isotope production.

The TRIGA reactor uses uranium zirconium hydride (UZrH) fuel, which has a large, prompt negative fuel temperature coefficient of reactivity, meaning that as the temperature of the core increases, the reactivity rapidly decreases. Because of this unique feature, it has been safely pulsed at a power of up to 22,000 megawatts. The hydrogen in the fuel is bound in the uranium zirconium hydride crystal structure with a vibrational energy of 0.14eV. These levels fill when the fuel is hot, and transfer energy to thermal neutrons making them more energetic and, therefore, less likely to cause a fission. TRIGA was originally designed to be fueled with highly enriched uranium, but in 1978 the US Department of Energy launched its Reduced Enrichment for Research Test Reactors program, which promoted reactor conversion to low-enriched uranium fuel.

== History ==
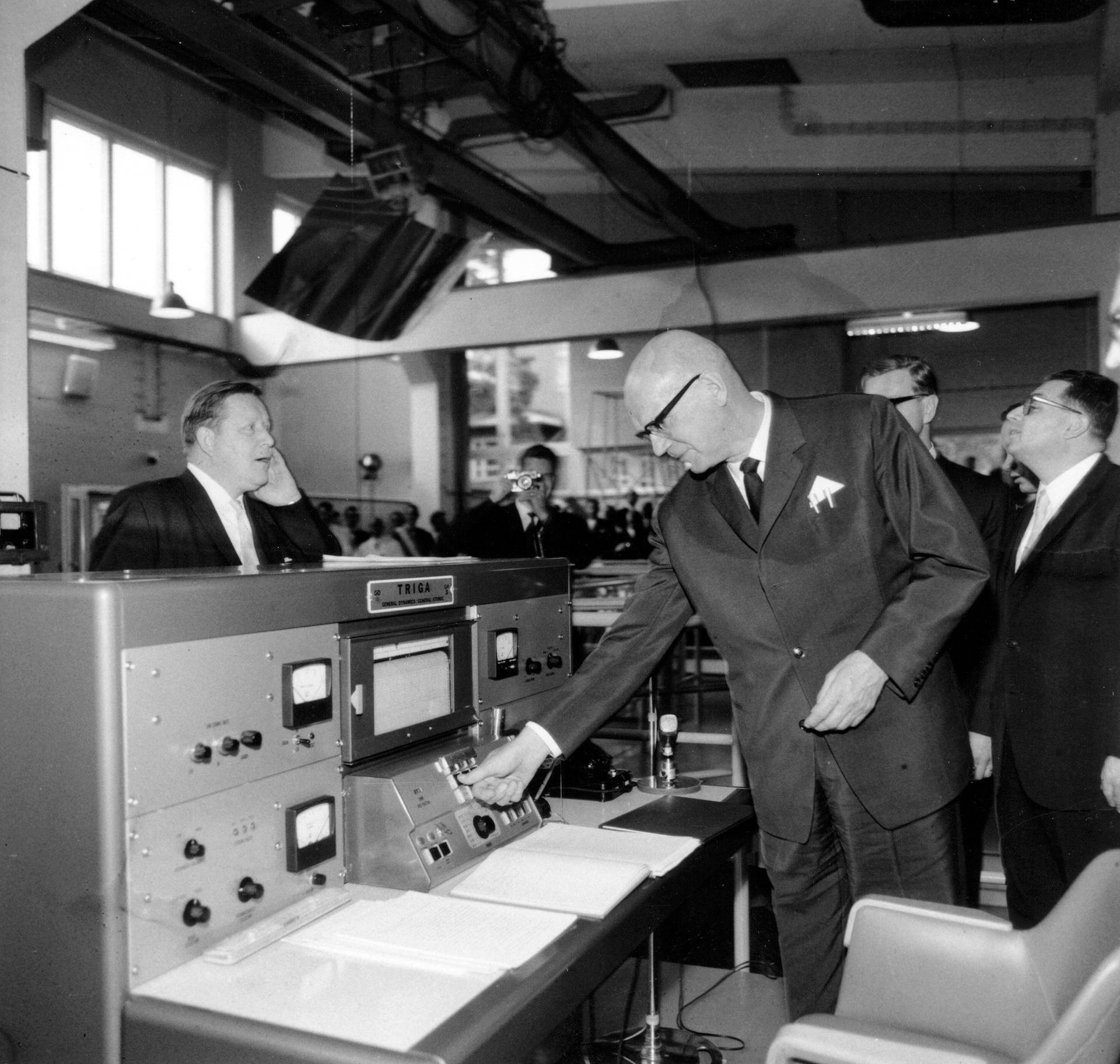
A TRIGA Mark II taken into use at Helsinki University of Technology in 1962 by the Finnish President Urho Kekkonen.

The concept of the TRIGA reactor was invented in the summer of 1956 when the president of the newly founded company General Atomics, Frederic de Hoffmann, invited a group 30–40 nuclear scientists (many of them alumni of the Manhattan Project) to consider what types of reactors would be commercially promising. The exploratory work focused on three concepts: a "Ship Reactor" (to propel merchant ships), a "Test Reactor" (for experimentally irradiating parts of nuclear power reactors), and a "Safe Reactor" (which eventually became TRIGA). During June-September the scientists worked out designs for the three reactors, and at the end of the summer de Hoffmann chose TRIGA for commercial development.

The "Safe reactor" working group was led by Edward Teller, who proposed that General Atomics should break into the market by developing a reactor that was much safer than its competitors. In Teller's words the reactor should be safe "even in the hands of a young graduate student", or in the words of Freeman Dyson "even in the hands of an idiot clever enough to by-pass the entire control system and blow out the control rods with dynamite." The working group comprised ten physicists, chemists, and engineers, including Freeman Dyson (who worked on the mathematical theory) and Massoud T. Simnad (who developed the fuel chemistry). At the end of the summer the preliminary design was handed over to a smaller team of General Atomics scientists, Ted Taylor, Stan Koutz, and Andrew McReynolds, for detailed development. The prototype for the TRIGA nuclear reactor (TRIGA Mark I) was commissioned on 3 May 1958 on the General Atomics campus in San Diego and operated until shut down in 1997. It has been designated as a nuclear historic landmark by the American Nuclear Society.

Mark II, Mark III, and other variants of the TRIGA design have subsequently been produced, and a total of 33 TRIGA reactors have been installed at locations across the United States. Those that remain operational continue to be upgraded or modernized. A further 33 reactors have been installed in other countries. Many of these installations were prompted by US President Eisenhower's 1953 Atoms for Peace policy, which sought to extend access to nuclear physics to countries in the American sphere of influence. Consequently, TRIGA reactors can be found in a total of 24 countries, including Austria, Bangladesh, Brazil, Congo, Colombia, United Kingdom, Finland, Germany, Taiwan, Japan, South Korea, Italy, Indonesia, Malaysia, Mexico, Morocco, Philippines, Puerto Rico, Romania, Slovenia, Thailand, Turkey, and Vietnam.

TRIGA International, a joint venture between General Atomics and CERCA—then a subsidiary of AREVA of France—was established in 1996. Since then, all TRIGA fuel assemblies have been manufactured at CERCA's plant in Romans-sur-Isère, France.

Some of the main competitors to General Atomics in the supply of research reactors are Korea Atomic Energy Research Institute (KAERI) of South Korea and INVAP of Argentina.

The TRIGA Power System (TPS) is a proposed small power plant and heat source, based upon the TRIGA reactor and its unique uranium zirconium hydride fuel, with a thermal power output of 64 MW producing 16 MW of electricity.

== Inherent Safety via Thermal Neutrons ==
Edward Teller's goal was an "inherently safe" reactor, meaning that even if all the control rods are abruptly withdrawn, the reactor will settle to a stable state before it is damaged by the heat. To achieve this it needs to have a large negative temperature coefficient, i.e. the amount of reactivity should decrease quickly as the reactor gets hotter.

Most nuclear reactors exhibit a negative temperature coefficient to some extent. As fuel temperature rises, thermal expansion reduces the fuel density, lowering reactivity. In addition, the neutron absorption of U-238 (the non-fissile uranium isotope) increases with temperature due to Doppler broadening, increasing neutron capture and thereby reducing the number of neutrons available to sustain the fission chain reaction.

The TRIGA design additionally makes use of effects related to the energy of thermal neutrons. Like most reactors, TRIGA is a thermal-neutron reactor in which fast neutrons produced by fission are slowed by a neutron moderator until they reach thermal equilibrium with the surrounding material. The U-235 fission cross section is much larger for low-energy neutrons than for higher-energy ones. As the temperature of the moderator increases, the average energy of thermal neutrons also increases, reducing the probability that they will induce fission and increasing the likelihood that they will escape from the fuel (the "leakage effect") and be absorbed elsewhere. An even larger negative coefficient can be obtained by incorporating neutron absorbers such as erbium into the fuel, which preferentially absorb higher-energy thermal neutrons.

The challenge of exploiting the leakage effect was to ensure that the temperature of the neutrons tracks the temperature of the reactor. In general the thermal energy of the neutrons will always correspond closely to the temperature of the moderator. But in a conventional reactor the moderator is separate from the fuel; for example a light-water reactor uses water next to the fuel rods as a neutron moderator. If there is a power surge in such a reactor, the fuel rods can heat up and melt long before the water starts to heat up. Therefore, the TRIGA designers set out to make a "homogeneous reactor", where the fissionable material and the moderator are combined in a homogeneous mixture.

Several candidate materials were investigated as potential moderators that could be combined with uranium fuel, including beryllium, beryllium oxide, graphite, lithium hydride, sodium hydride, and zirconium hydride (ZrH_{x}). Zirconium hydride was ultimately selected because of its low chemical reactivity, low toxicity, good thermal conductivity, and low cost. However, little was known in 1956 about the metallurgy or neutronics of ZrH, so extensive experimental and theoretical work was needed.

The TRIGA fuel consists of a homogeneous alloy of uranium-zirconium hydride. The zirconium matrix can hold a large number of hydrogen atoms (with a H/Zr ratio around 1.6), and the hydrogen is a good moderator. Water surrounding the fuel provides additional moderation and cooling. Because the uranium is dispersed inside the zirconium hydride matrix, the temperature of the hydrogen and hence the thermal neutrons instantly track the rest of the fuel. Using standard TRIGA fuel, 50% of the temperature coefficient of the reactor is due to the thermal spectrum of the neutrons.

== List of all TRIGA Nuclear reactors built around the world ==
Country	City	Name	Type	Status	Thermal Power [kW]	Operation Date	Closure Date	Owner and Operator	Notes
Austria	Vienna	TRIGA II VIENNA	TRIGA Mark II	Operational	250	1962-03-07		Atominstitute / Institute of Atomic and Subatomic Physics	
Bangladesh	Savar, Dhaka	BTRR, BAEC TRIGA Research Reactor	TRIGA Mark II	Operational	3000	1986-09-14		Atomic Energy Research Establishment (Bangladesh)	
Brazil	Belo Horizonte	TRIGA IPR-R1	TRIGA Mark I	Operational	100	1960-11-06		CDTN - Centro de Desenvolvimento de Tecnologia Nuclear	*The expansion to 250 KW is in the licensing process, for which a new refrigeration system has been installed.
Colombia	Bogota	IAN-R1	TRIGA CONV	Operational	30	1965-01-20			
Congo, DR of	Kinshasa	TRICO I	TRIGA Mark I	Permanent Shutdown	50	1959-06-06	1970	CREN-K University of Kinshasa	
Congo, DR of	Kinshasa	TRICO II	TRIGA Mark II	Extended Shutdown	1	1972-03-24		CREN-K University of Kinshasa	extended shut down since 2004 [18]
Finland	Espoo	FIR-1	TRIGA Mark II	Under Decommissioning	250	1962-03-27	2015	VTT Technical Research Centre of Finland	
Germany	Frankfurt am Main	FRF-2	TRIGA Conv	Decommissioned	1	1977-10-01			
Germany	Heidelberg	TRIGA HD I	TRIGA Mark I	Decommissioned	250	1966-08-01			
Germany	Hannover	FRH	TRIGA Mark I	Decommissioned	250	1973-01-31			
Germany	Heidelberg	TRIGA HD II	TRIGA Mark I	Decommissioned	250	1978-02-28			
Germany	Mainz	FRMZ	TRIGA Mark II	Operational	100	1965-08-03		Johannes Gutenberg-Universität Mainz	
Germany	Munich	FRN	TRIGA Mark III	Under Decommissioning	1	1972-08-23			
Indonesia	Bandung	TRIGA Mark II, Bandung	TRIGA Mark II	Operational	2000	1964-10-19			2MW installed 1997
Indonesia	Sleman	KARTINI-PSTA	TRIGA Mark II	Operational	100	1979-01-25			
Italy	Rome	TRIGA RC-1	TRIGA Mark II	Operational	1000	1960-06-11			
Italy	Pavia	LENA, TRIGA II PAVIA	TRIGA Mark II	Operational	250	1965-11-15			
Japan	Tōkai, Ibaraki	NSRR	TRIGA Acpr	Operational	300	1975-06-30			
Japan	Yokosuka	TRIGA-II Rikkyo	TRIGA Mark II	Under Decommissioning	100	1961-12-08			
Japan	Tokyo	Musashi Reactor	TRIGA Mark II	Under Decommissioning	100	1963-01-30			
Korea, Republic of	Seoul	KRR-1	TRIGA Mark II	Decommissioned	250	1962-03-19		KAERI	Research Reactor,100 kW, built 1962 (Decommissioned)[52]
Korea, Republic of	Seoul	KRR-2	TRIGA Mark III	Decommissioned	2	1972-04-10		KAERI	Research Reactor, 2MW, BUILT 1972 (Decommissioned)[53]
Malaysia	Kajang, Selangor	TRIGA Puspati (RTP)	TRIGA Mark II	Operational	1000	1982-06-28		Malaysian Nuclear Agency	
Mexico	La Marquesa Ocoyoacac	TRIGA Mark III	TRIGA Mark III	Operational	1000	1968-11-08		National Institute for Nuclear Research	
Morocco	Rabat	MA-R1	TRIGA Mark II	Operational	2000	2007-05-02			
Philippines	Quezon City	PRR-1	Subcrit (TRIGA-converted)	Operational	0				3 MW TRIGA-converted reactor, Quezon City. Managed by the Philippine Nuclear Research Institute (formerly Philippine Atomic Energy Commission). 1st criticality in August 1963, reactor conversion in March 1984, criticality after conversion in April 1988, shut down since 1988 for pool repairs, on extended shutdown at present.
Puerto Rico		Mayagüez - TRIGA reactor (dismantled)		Dismantled					
Romania	Pitesti	TRIGA II Pitesti - SS Core	TRIGA Dual Core	Operational	14000	1980-02-02			
Romania	Pitesti	TRIGA II Pitesti - Pulsed	TRIGA Dual Core	Operational	500	1980-02-02			
Slovenia	Ljubljana	TRIGA- MARK II LJUBLJANA	TRIGA Mark II	Operational	250	1966-05-31		Jožef Stefan Institute	(web page link) [51]
Taiwan	Hsinchu City	THOR	TRIGA Conv	Operational		1961-04-13			[56]
Thailand	Bangkok	TRR-1/M1	TRIGA Mark III	Operational		1977-11-07		Thailand Institute of Nuclear Technology (TINT)	Thai Research Reactor 1/Modification 1, Installed 1962, modified 1975–77.
Turkey	Istanbul	ITU-TRR	TRIGA Mark II	Operational	250	1979-03-11		Istanbul Technical University	Institute of Energy
United Kingdom	Billingham	ICI TRIGA Reactor	TRIGA Mark I	Decommissioned	250	1971-08-01	1988	ICI Physics and Radioisotopes Dept of ICI R&D (later to become Tracerco)	
USA	Urbana, IL	LOPRA Univ. Illinois	TRIGA	Decommissioned	10	1971-12-28			
USA	San Ramon, CA	ARRR	TRIGA CONV	Operational	250	1964-07-09			
USA	Pullman, WA	WSUR Washington State Univ.	TRIGA CONV	Operational	1000	1961-03-07			
USA	Madison, WI	UWNR Univ. Wisconsin	TRIGA CONV	Operational	1000	1961-03-26			
USA	College Station, TX	NSCR Texas A&M Univ.	TRIGA CONV	Operational	1000	1962-01-01			
USA	Mayagüez, Puerto Rico	TRIGA Puerto Rico Nuclear Center	TRIGA CONV	Decommissioned	2000	1972-01-19			
USA	State College, PA	PSBR Penn St. Unv.	TRIGA Mark CONV	Operational	1000	1955-08-15			
USA	Silver Spring, MD	DORF TRIGA Mark F	TRIGA Mark F	Decommissioned	250	1961-09-01			
USA	Bethesda, MD	AFRRI TRIGA	TRIGA Mark F	Operational	1000	1962-01-01			
USA	Hawthorne, CA	TRIGA Mark F, Northrop	TRIGA Mark F	Decommissioned	1000	1963-01-01			
USA	Omaha, NE	Veterans Affairs RR	TRIGA Mark I	Decommissioned	20	1959-06-26			
USA	Salt Lake City, UT	TRIGA Univ. Utah	TRIGA Mark I	Operational	100	1975-10-25			
USA	Tucson, AZ	Univ. Arizona TRIGA	TRIGA Mark I	Decommissioned	100	1958-12-06			
USA	San Diego, CA	GA-TRIGA I	TRIGA Mark I	Under Decommissioning	250	1958-05-03			
USA	San Diego, CA	GA-TRIGA F	TRIGA Mark I	Under Decommissioning	250	1960-07-01			
USA	Portland, OR	RRR Reed College	TRIGA Mark I	Operational	250	1968-07-02			
USA	Irvine, CA	UC Irvine TRIGA	TRIGA Mark I	Operational	250	1969-11-25			
USA	Austin, TX	UT TRIGA Univ. Texas	TRIGA Mark I	Decommissioned	250	1963-01-01			
USA	East Lansing, MI	TRIGA Mark I Michigan State Univ.	TRIGA Mark I	Decommissioned	250	1969-03-21			
USA	Midland, MI	Dow TRIGA	TRIGA Mark I	Operational	300	1967-07-06			
USA	Richland, WA	NRF, Neutron Rad Facility	TRIGA Mark I	Under Decommissioning	1000	1977-03-01			
USA	Denver, CO	GSTR US Geological Survey	TRIGA Mark I	Operational	1000	1969-02-26			
USA	San Diego, CA	TRIGA Mark II	TRIGA Mark II	Decommissioned	50	1959-12-11			
USA	Manhattan, KS	KSU TRIGA Mark II	TRIGA Mark II	Operational	250	1962-10-16			
USA	Idaho Falls, ID	NRAD	TRIGA Mark II	Operational	250	1977-10-12			
USA	Ithaca, NY	TRIGA Cornell Univ	TRIGA Mark II	Decommissioned	500	1962-01-01			
USA	Corvallis, OR	OSTR, Oregon State Univ.	TRIGA Mark II	Operational	1100	1967-03-08			
USA	Austin, TX	TRIGA II Univ. Texas	TRIGA Mark II	Operational	1100	1992-03-12			
USA	Urbana, IL	University of Illinois Advanced TRIGA	TRIGA Mark II	Decommissioned	1500	1960-08-16	1998	Grainger College of Engineering - Nuclear, Plasma & Radiological Engineering	
USA	Sacramento, CA	UC Davis/McClellan TRIGA	TRIGA Mark II	Operational	2000	1990-01-20			
USA	Berkeley, CA	BRR UC Berkeley	TRIGA Mark III	Decommissioned	1000	1966-08-10			
USA	San Diego, CA	GA-TRIGA III	TRIGA Mark III	Decommissioned	2000	1966-01-01			
USA	College Park, MD	MUTR Univ. Maryland	TRIGA MODIFIED	Operational	250	1960-12-01			
USA	Albuquerque, NM	ACRR Annular Core RR	TRIGA MODIFIED	Operational	2400	1967-06-01			
Vietnam	Da Lat	Dalat Research Reactor	TRIGA Mark II	Operational	500	1963-02-26			(supplied by USA 1963, shut down 1975, reactivated by USSR 1984)

== See also ==
- List of commercial nuclear reactors
- List of nuclear research reactors
- Hydrogen-moderated self-regulating nuclear power module
