= X-ray interferometer =

An X-ray interferometer is analogous to a neutron interferometer. It has been suggested that it may offer the very highest spatial resolution in astronomy, though the technology is unproven as of 2008.

One technique is triple Laue interferometry (LLL interferometry).

== See also ==
- High energy X-rays
