= Stefanie Barz =

Professor of Quantum Information and Technology

- Education: University of Vienna; Johannes Gutenberg University Mainz
- Known for: Photonic quantum technology
- Scientific career
- Workplaces: University of Stuttgart; University of Oxford; University of Vienna
- Thesis: Photonic Quantum Computing
- Doctoral advisor: Anton Zeilinger

Stefanie Barz is a German physicist and Professor of Quantum Information and Technology at the University of Stuttgart working in the field of photonic quantum technology.

== Early life and education ==
Barz studied at the Johannes Gutenberg University Mainz, with a stay at the KTH Royal Institute of Technology within the Erasmus Programme. She earned her PhD from the University of Vienna under the supervision of Anton Zeilinger, working on various aspects of photonic quantum computing, including 'blind' quantum computing using entangled photons, where the sender knows the initial state of entanglement while companies in control of data processing do not, making it impossible for them to decode the information without destroying it. For her dissertation she was awarded the Laudimaxima Prize of the University of Vienna, and her work has been featured in New Scientist and covered by the BBC and NBC. In 2013 Barz was awarded the Maria Schaumayer Prize and the Loschmidt Prize.

From 2014 to 2017, Barz was a Marie Skłodowska-Curie Fellow as well as a Millard and Lee Alexander Fellow in the Christ Church College at the University of Oxford. She worked with Ian Walmsley on three-photon interference, during which project she created integrated photon sources, fibre components and waveguide circuits.

== Research and career ==
Barz was appointed full professor at the University of Stuttgart in 2017. The research focus of her group is on the study of single photons and quantum states of light, covering both fundamental quantum physics and aspects of integrated photonic technology, with the ultimate goal of applying fundamental advances in quantum computing, quantum communication, and quantum networking. In 2018 she was awarded a multi-million-Euro grant to work on quantum technologies using silicon-based photonics and since 2022 she leads the PhotonQ project, which aims to realize a photonic quantum processor.

Since 2022, Barz is Director of the Center for Integrated Quantum Science and Technology (IQST), the joint quantum centre of the Universities of Stuttgart, Ulm, and the Max Planck Institute for Solid State Research. She also serves on the Strategic Advisory Board of QuantERA, a network of quantum technology researchers, on the executive board of the CZS Center QPhoton, and the advisory board of QuantumBW, an innovation initiative bundling quantum technology expertise in Baden-Württemberg.

== Awards and honours ==
- 2024: Honorary Professorship, Vienna University of Technology
- 2022: Award for best elective physics lecture, University of Stuttgart
- 2015: University of Oxford Millard and Lee Alexander Fellowship
- 2015: European Commission Marie Skłodowska-Curie Individual Fellowship
- 2014: University of Vienna & City of Vienna Doc.Award 2013
- 2014: Austrian Chemical-Physical Society Loschmidt Prize
- 2013: Maria Schaumayer Prize
- 2012: Falling Walls Scholarship
- 2011: University of Vienna Laudimaxima Award
