= Eagle-1 =

European quantum communication satellite

- Mission type: Technology demonstration
- Operator: European Union; European Space Agency

Spacecraft properties
- Manufacturer: (Luxembourg) SES

Start of mission
- Launch date: 2026 or 2027 (planned)
- Rocket: Vega C

Eagle-1 is a future European technology demonstration satellite for in-orbit demonstration of space-based quantum key distribution. The satellite was developed by a consortium of companies led by the Luxembourg-headquartered SES for the European Union (EU) and the European Space Agency (ESA). Eagle-1 is the first step in development of a sovereign European quantum communication infrastructure, specifically the EuroQCI network. The satellite will be launched to low-Earth orbit on a Vega C rocket from the Guiana Space Centre in French Guiana in late 2026 or early 2027.

== See also ==
- List of European Space Agency programmes and missions
- SAGA – European quantum communication satellite
- QUBE-II – German technology demonstration satellite
- Quantum Experiments at Space Scale – Chinese quantum research satellite
