= Isaac Newton Medal =

Gold medal awarded annually by the Institute of Physics

Isaac Newton Medal and Prize
- Awarded for: World-leading contributions to physics by an individual of any nationality.
- Sponsored by: Institute of Physics
- Country: United Kingdom
- Presented by: Institute of Physics
- Rewards: Gold medal, £1000
- First award: 2008
- Website: Official website

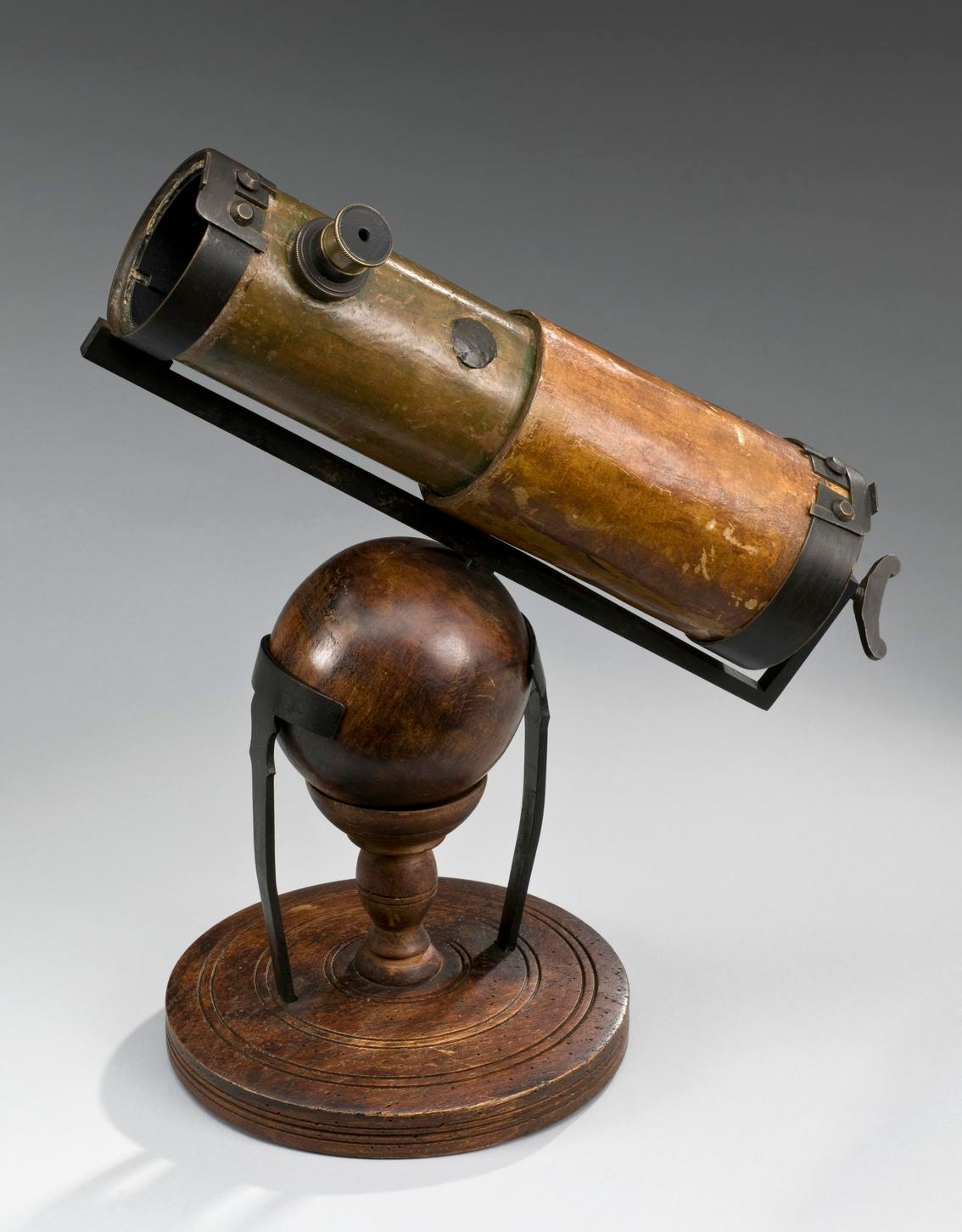
A replica of a second reflecting telescope Newton presented to the Royal Society in 1672 (the first one he made in 1668 was loaned to an instrument maker but there is no further record of what happened to it).

The Isaac Newton Medal and Prize is a gold medal awarded annually by the Institute of Physics (IOP) accompanied by a prize of £1,000. The award is given to a physicist, regardless of subject area, background or nationality, for outstanding contributions to physics. The award winner is invited to give a lecture at the institute. It is named in honour of Sir Isaac Newton. The award is recognized as the most prestigious award of the IOP.

The first medal was awarded in 2008 to Anton Zeilinger, having been announced in 2007. It gained national recognition in the UK in 2013 when it was awarded for technology that could lead to an 'invisibility cloak'. By 2018 it was recognised internationally as the highest honour from the IOP. In 2020, a citation study identified it as one of the five most prestigious prizes in physics, ranking third.

== Recipients ==
Year	Name	Rationale (for)
2008	Anton Zeilinger	"his pioneering conceptual and experimental contributions to the foundations of quantum physics, which have become the cornerstone for the rapidly-evolving field of quantum information"
2009	Alan Guth	"his invention of the inflationary universe model, his recognition that inflation would solve major problems confronting then-standard cosmology, and his calculation, with others, of the spectrum of density fluctuations that gave rise to structure in the universe"
2010	Edward Witten	"his many profound contributions that have transformed areas of particle theory, quantum field theory and general relativity"
2011	Leo Kadanoff	"inventing conceptual tools that reveal the deep implications of scale invariance on the behavior of phase transitions and dynamical systems"
2012	Martin Rees	his outstanding contributions to relativistic astrophysics and cosmology
2013	John Pendry	“seminal contributions to surface science, disordered systems and photonics”
2014	Deborah S. Jin	"pioneering the field of quantum-degenerate Fermi gases"
2015	Eli Yablonovitch	"visionary and foundational contributions to photonic nanostructures"
2016	Tom Kibble	"outstanding lifelong commitment to physics" (posthumously)
2017	Charles L. Bennett	"leadership of the Microwave Anisotropy Probe, a satellite experiment that revolutionized cosmology, transforming it from an order-of-magnitude game to a paragon of precision science"
2018	Paul Corkum	"his outstanding contributions to experimental physics"
2019	Michael Pepper	"the creation of the field of semiconductor nanoelectronics and discovery of new quantum phenomena"
2020	Nader Engheta	"groundbreaking innovation and transformative contributions to electromagnetic complex materials and nanoscale optics, and for pioneering development of the fields of near-zero-index metamaterials, and material-inspired analogue computation and optical nanocircuitry"
2021	David Deutsch	"founding the discipline named quantum computation and establishing quantum computation's fundamental idea, now known as the ‘qubit’ or quantum bit"
2022	Margaret Murnane	"pioneering and sustained contributions to the development of ultrafast lasers and coherent X-ray sources and the use of such sources to understand the quantum nature of materials"
2023	James Binney	"advancing the science of stellar dynamics and using strong physical intuition to widen and deepen our understanding of how galaxies are structured and formed."
2024	Richard Friend	"for pioneering and enduring work on the fundamental electronic properties of molecular semiconductors and in their engineering development."
2025	Michael Berry	"for groundbreaking work on the geometrical Berry phase of quantum states in topological physics and seminal contributions to mathematical physics in quantum chaos, catastrophe theory and singular optics."
2026	Ignacio Cirac	"for pioneering contributions that founded modern quantum information science, uniting profound theoretical insight, experimental vision, and exceptional scientific leadership shaping quantum physics and technology worldwide."

== See also ==
- University of Glasgow Isaac Newton Medal
- Institute of Physics Awards
- List of physics awards
- List of awards named after people
