= Helmut Rauch =

Austrian physicist (1939–2019)

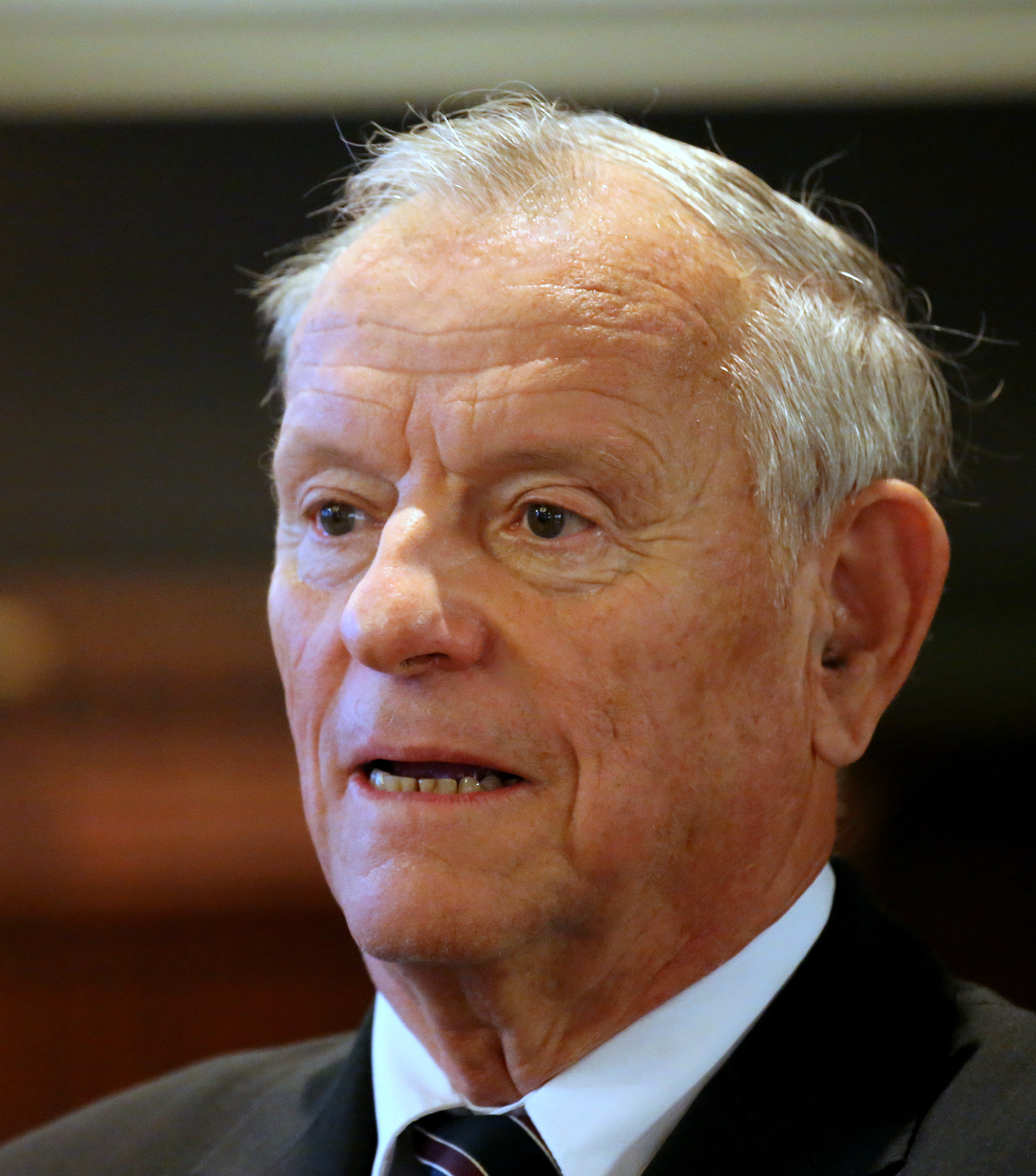
- Helmut Rauch in Budapest, 2013
- Born: 22 January 1939; Krems an der Donau, Austria, Nazi Germany
- Died: 2 September 2019 (aged 80); Vienna, Austria
- Education: Vienna University of Technology
- Known for: Neutron interferometry
- Awards: Erwin Schrödinger Prize (1977); Wilhelm Exner Medal (1985)
- Scientific career
- Fields: Physics
- Doctoral advisor: Gustav Ortner
- Doctoral students: Anton Zeilinger

Helmut Rauch (22 January 1939 – 2 September 2019) was an Austrian physicist. He was especially known for his pioneering experiments on neutron interference.

Rauch studied Physics at Vienna University of Technology and worked at the Institute of Atomic and Subatomic Physics there. He was also affiliated with the Forschungszentrum Jülich and the Institut Laue-Langevin in Grenoble.

In his Nobel Prize Lecture in 2022, Anton Zeilinger spoke about what his mentor, Helmut Rauch taught him. In a part of his speech, he said: "From my mentor, I learnt that you can have ideas. Which are wrong in a sense that the arguments are wrong but the idea is right. That intuition can be much stronger than a logic argument".

== Neutron interference experiments ==
In 1974, Rauch, together with Ulrich Bonse and Wolfgang Treimer, demonstrated the first matter wave interference of neutrons. This demonstrated the wave-like nature of neutrons for the first time and was another experimental proof that not only photons can be described by waves, but also massive particles. Further they demonstrated the fundamental symmetry of spin-1/2 particles under rotation.

== Death ==
Rauch died on 2 September 2019, aged 80, following a short illness in Vienna.
