= Chen Yu'ao =

Chinese physicist (born 1981)

Chen Yu'ao (Chinese: 陈宇翱; pinyin: Chén Yǔ'áo; born April 1981) is a Chinese physicist and a professor at the University of Science and Technology of China (USTC), working on quantum information, quantum communication and quantum simulation.

Chen was born in Qidong, Nantong, Jiangsu province in 1981. He was the winner of the Gold Medal and First prize in the experimental competition at the 29th International Physics Olympiad in 1998. He graduated from USTC with his bachelor's and master's degrees, and earned his PhD at Heidelberg University in 2008. He won the Fresnel Prize for Fundamental Aspects in 2013. As a member of Pan Jianwei's team, he won the 2015 State Nature Science First Class Award.
