= Pan Jianwei =

Chinese quantum physicist and university administrator

- 潘建伟
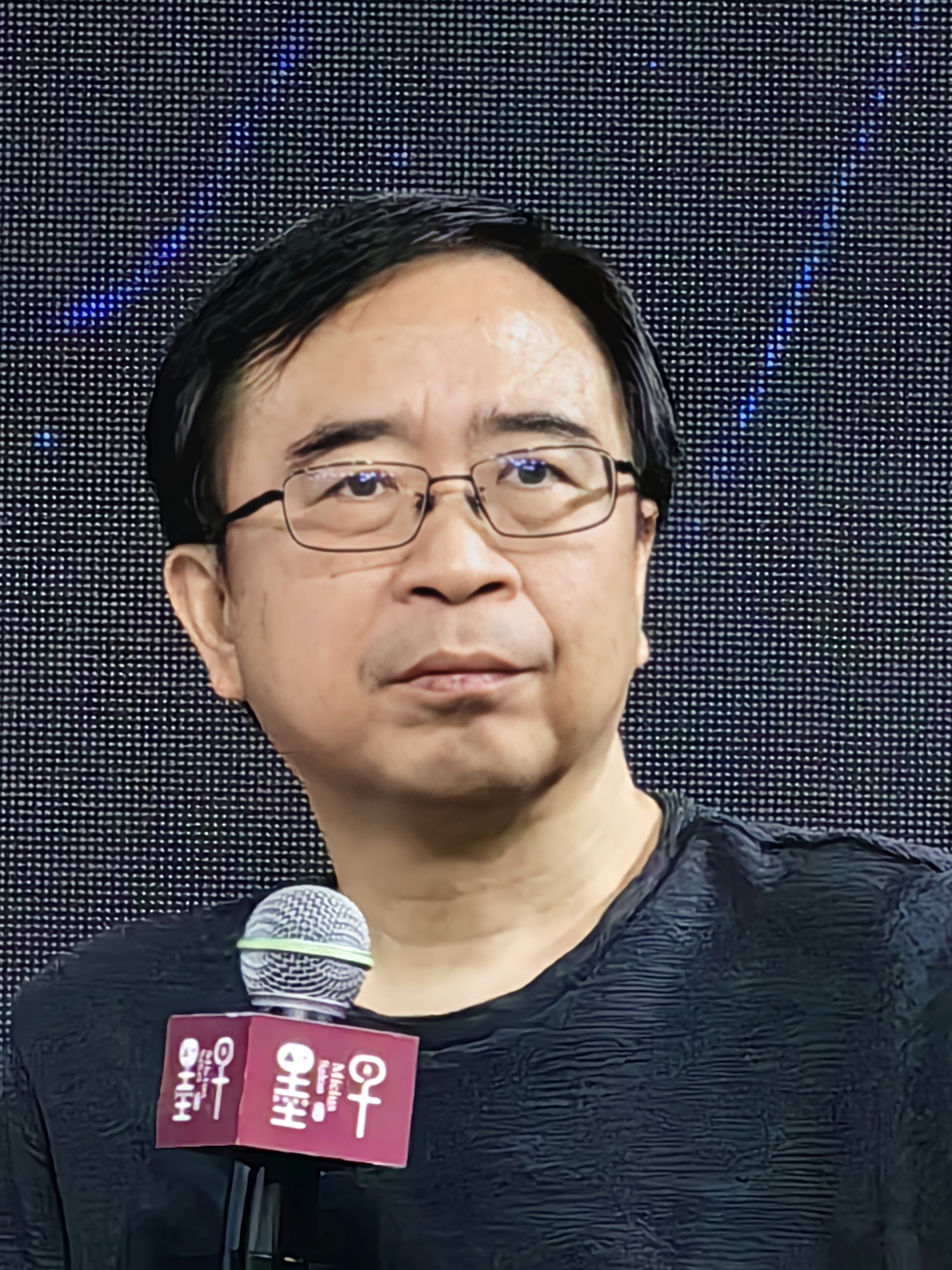
- Born: 11 March 1970 (age 56); Dongyang, Zhejiang, China
- Title: Professor and Executive Vice President of the University of Science and Technology of China; Vice Chairman of Jiusan Society
- Scientific career
- Education: USTC; University of Vienna
- Known for: Multi-photon quantum entanglement Free-space quantum teleportation Quantum computer
- Awards: Erich Schmid Prize (2003); Emmy Noether Research Award (2004); Sofja Kovalevskaja Award (2004); Fresnel Prize (2005); Chinese Young Scientist Prize (2006); QCMC Quantum Communication Award (2012); Physics World 2015 Breakthrough of the Year; 2015 State Natural Science Award (First Class); 2017 Future Science Prize; 2018 Willis E. Lamb Award for Laser Science and Quantum Optics; Micius Quantum Prize (2019); ZEISS Research Award (2020)
- Fields: Quantum mechanics
- Workplaces: University of Science and Technology of China
- Doctoral advisor: Anton Zeilinger

Pan Jianwei (Chinese: 潘建伟; pinyin: Pān Jiànwěi; born 11 March 1970) is a Chinese academic administrator and quantum physicist. He is a university administrator and professor of physics at the University of Science and Technology of China. Pan is known for his work in the field of quantum entanglement, quantum information and quantum computers. In 2017, he was named one of Nature's 10, which labelled him "Father of Quantum". He is an academician of the Chinese Academy of Sciences and the World Academy of Sciences and Executive Vice President of the University of Science and Technology of China. He also serves as one of the Vice Chairman of Jiusan Society.

== Early life and education ==
Pan was born in Dongyang, Jinhua, Zhejiang province in 1970. In 1987, he entered the University of Science and Technology of China (USTC), from which he received his bachelor's and master's degrees. He received his PhD from the University of Vienna in Austria, where he studied and worked in the group led by Nobel prize winning physicist Anton Zeilinger.

== Contributions ==
Pan's team demonstrated five-photon entanglement in 2004. Under his leadership, the world's first quantum satellite launched successfully in August 2016 as part of the Quantum Experiments at Space Scale, a Chinese research project. In June 2017, Pan's team used their quantum satellite to demonstrate entanglement with satellite-to-ground total summed lengths between 1600km and 2400km and entanglement distribution over 1200km between receiver stations.

In 2021, Physics World reported that Pan had led two teams which built two quantum computers, one of which used superconducting circuits and the other of which used photons. The device using superconducting circuits, named "Zuchongzhi 2.1", was claimed to be one million times faster than its nearest competitor, Google's Sycamore.

== Awards and recognition ==
Pan was elected to the Chinese Academy of Sciences in 2011 at the age of 41, making him one of the youngest CAS academicians. He was then elected to the World Academy of Sciences in 2012 and won the International Quantum Communication Award in the same year.

In April 2014, he was appointed Vice President of the University of Science and Technology of China.

His team's work on double quantum-teleportation was selected as the Physics World "Top Breakthrough of the Year" in 2015. His team, whose members include Peng Chengzhi, Chen Yu'ao, Lu Chao-Yang, and Chen Zengbing, won the State Natural Science Award (First Class) in 2015.

In 2017, the journal Nature named Pan, along with such figures as Ann Olivarius and Scott Pruitt, one of the top 10 people who made "a significant impact in science either for good or for bad", with the label "Father of Quantum" given to Pan. The same year he won the Future Science Prize.

Pan was included in Time magazine's 100 Most Influential People of 2018. The same year, he became a laureate of the Asian Scientist 100 by the Asian Scientist.

In 2019, Pan was appointed as lead editor of Physical Review Research. He also received The Optical Society's R. W. Wood Prize.

In 2020, Pan received the ZEISS Research Award.

In 2026, the IEEE Photonics Society awarded Pan (together with Lu Chao-Yang) their Quantum Electronics Award of "For pioneering work on single photon sources and optical quantum computing"

At an award ceremony in Paris in July 2026, Pan received from UNESCO the UNESCO-Russia Mendeleev International Prize in the Basic Sciences, with the following citation: "Professor Jian-Wei Pan is a world-leading expert in quantum optics, quantum communications and quantum computation at the University of Science and Technology of China. He is recognized for his seminal contributions to large-scale secure quantum communications and scalable quantum computation. His team developed the Micius satellite, enabling quantum key distribution and quantum teleportation over thousands of kilometres, and has demonstrated quantum computational advantage, bringing the prospect of a global quantum network from theory to reality."
