= Anton Zeilinger =

Austrian quantum physicist (born 1945)

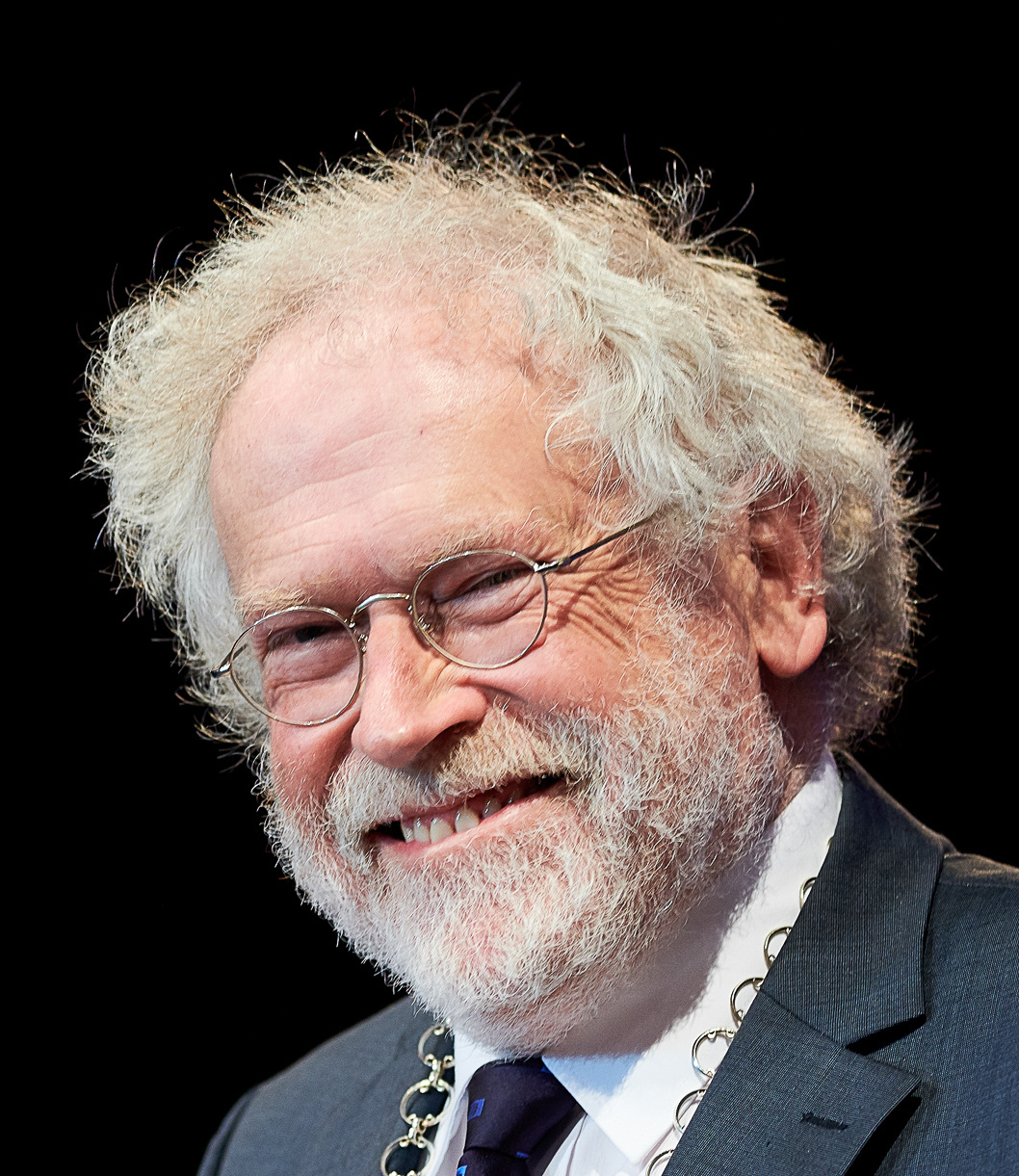
- Zeilinger in 2019
- Born: 20 May 1945 (age 81); Ried im Innkreis, Austria
- Education: University of Vienna (PhD); TU Wien (Dr. habil.)
- Known for: Bell test experiments; Elitzur–Vaidman bomb tester experiment; Greenberger–Horne–Zeilinger state; GHZ experiment; Quantum teleportation; Quantum entanglement swapping; Superdense coding
- Awards: Pour le Mérite (2000); Klopsteg Memorial Award (2004); King Faisal Prize (2005); Wilhelm Exner Medal (2005); Isaac Newton Medal (2007); Wolf Prize in Physics (2010); Racah lecture (2012); John Stewart Bell Prize (2017); IEEE Honorary Membership (2018); Micius Quantum Prize (2019); Nobel Prize in Physics (2022)
- Scientific career
- Fields: Physics, Quantum mechanics
- Workplaces: University of Vienna; University of Innsbruck; Technical University of Munich; TU Wien; Massachusetts Institute of Technology; Collège de France; Merton College, Oxford
- Thesis: Neutron depolarization measurements on a Dy-single crystal (1972)
- Doctoral advisor: Helmut Rauch
- Doctoral students: Stefanie Barz; Pan Jianwei; Thomas Jennewein; Julian Voss-Andreae; Gregor Weihs

Anton Zeilinger (German: [ˈanton ˈtsaɪlɪŋɐ]; born 20 May 1945) is an Austrian quantum physicist and Nobel laureate in physics of 2022. Zeilinger is professor of physics emeritus at the University of Vienna and senior scientist at the Institute for Quantum Optics and Quantum Information of the Austrian Academy of Sciences. Most of his research concerns the fundamental aspects and applications of quantum entanglement.

In 2007, Zeilinger received the first Inaugural Isaac Newton Medal of the Institute of Physics, London, for "his pioneering conceptual and experimental contributions to the foundations of quantum physics, which have become the cornerstone for the rapidly-evolving field of quantum information". In October 2022, he received the Nobel Prize in Physics, jointly with Alain Aspect and John Clauser for their work involving experiments with entangled photons, establishing the violation of Bell inequalities and pioneering quantum information science.

== Early life and education ==
Anton Zeilinger was born in 1945 in Ried im Innkreis, Upper Austria, Austria. He studied physics at the University of Vienna from 1963 to 1971. He received a doctorate from the University of Vienna in 1971, with a thesis on "Neutron depolarization measurements on a Dy-single crystal" under Helmut Rauch. He qualified as a university lecturer (habilitation) at the Vienna University of Technology in 1979.

== Career ==
In the 1970s, Zeilinger worked at the Vienna Atominstitut as a research assistant and later as an associate researcher at the Massachusetts Institute of Technology Neutron Diffraction Laboratory until 1979, when he accepted the position of assistant professor at the same Atominstitut. That year he qualified as a university professor at the Vienna University of Technology.

In 1981 Zeilinger returned to MIT, as an associate professor on the physics faculty, until 1983. Between 1980 and 1990 he worked as a professor at the Vienna University of Technology, the Technical University of Munich, the University of Innsbruck and the University of Vienna.

He was also the scientific director of the Institute for Quantum Optics and Quantum Information in Vienna between 2004 and 2013. Zeilinger became professor emeritus at the University of Vienna in 2013. He was president of the Austrian Academy of Sciences from 2013 till 2022.

Since 2006, Zeilinger is the vice chairman of the board of trustees of the Institute of Science and Technology Austria, an ambitious project initiated by Zeilinger's proposal. In 2009, he founded the International Academy Traunkirchen, which is dedicated to the support of gifted students in science and technology. He is a fan of the Hitchhiker's Guide To The Galaxy by Douglas Adams, going so far as to name his sailboat 42.

== Research ==
=== Quantum teleportation ===
Zeilinger published one of the first realizations of quantum teleportation of an independent qubit. He later expanded this work to developing a source for freely propagating teleported qubits and quantum teleportation over 144 kilometers between two Canary Islands. Quantum teleportation is an essential concept in many quantum information protocols. Besides its role for the transfer of quantum information, it is also considered as an important possible mechanism for building gates within quantum computers.

=== Entanglement swapping – teleportation of entanglement ===
Entanglement swapping is the teleportation of an entangled state. After its proposal, entanglement swapping was first realized experimentally by Zeilinger's group in 1998. It was then applied to carry out a delayed-choice entanglement swapping test.

=== Entanglement beyond two qubits – GHZ-states and their realizations ===
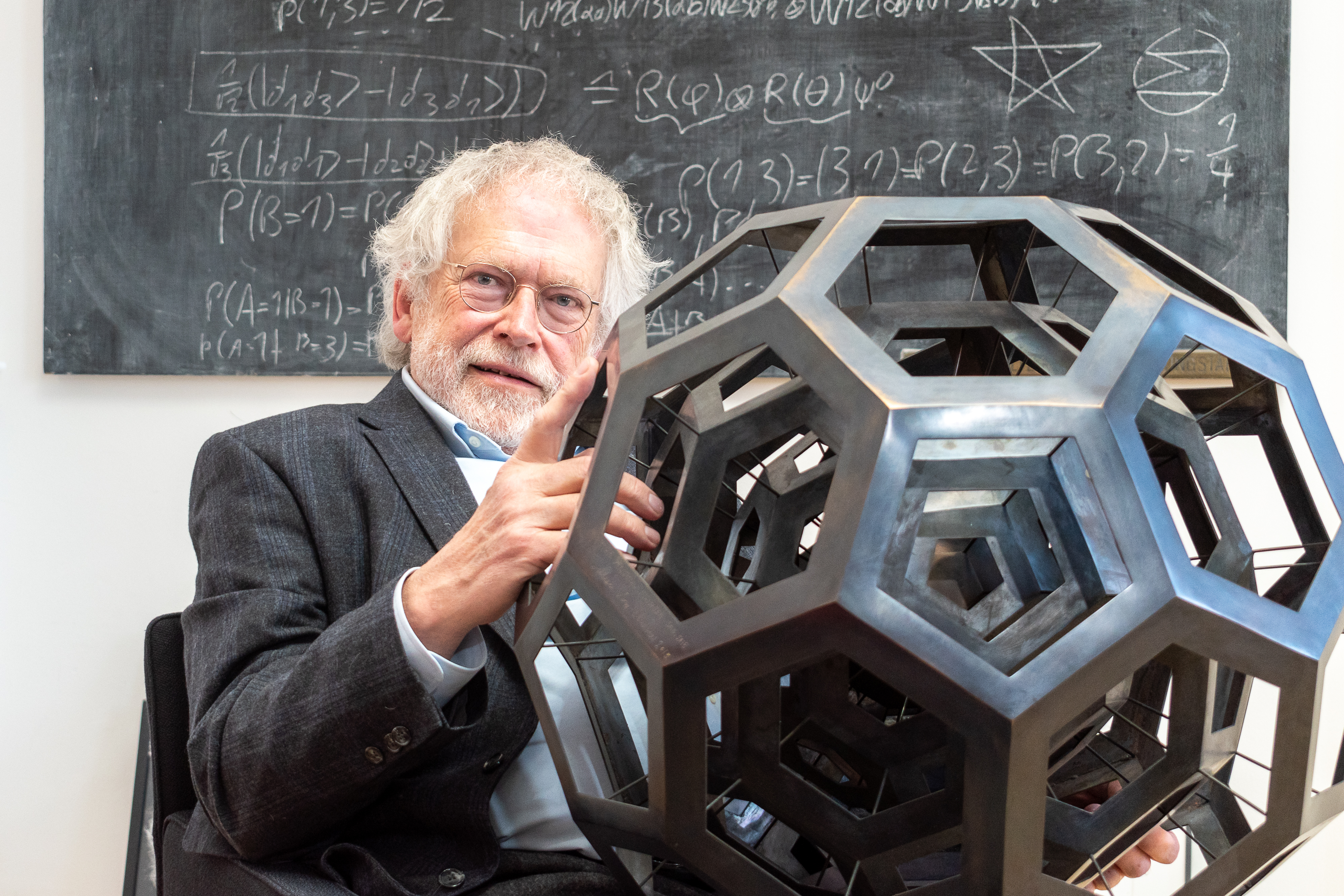
Anton Zeilinger holding a sculpture by Julian Voss-Andreae, photo by J. Godany

Anton Zeilinger contributed to the opening up of the field of multi-particle entanglement. In 1990, he was the first with Daniel Greenberger and Michael Horne to work on entanglement of more than two qubits. The resulting GHZ theorem (see Greenberger–Horne–Zeilinger state) is fundamental for quantum physics, as it provides the most succinct contradiction between local realism and the predictions of quantum mechanics.

GHZ states were the first instances of multi-particle entanglement ever investigated.

Finally, in 1999, he succeeded in providing the first experimental evidence of entanglement beyond two particles and also the first test of quantum nonlocality for GHZ states.

=== Quantum communication, quantum cryptography, quantum computation ===
In 1998 (published in 2000), his group was the first to implement quantum cryptography with entangled photons. He then applied quantum entanglement to optical quantum computation, where in 2005, he performed the first implementation of one-way quantum computation. This is a protocol based on quantum measurement as proposed by Knill, Laflamme and Milburn.

The experiments of Zeilinger and his group on the distribution of entanglement over large distances began with both free-space and fiber-based quantum communication and teleportation between laboratories located on the different sides of the river Danube. This was then extended to larger distances across the city of Vienna and over 144 km between two Canary Islands, resulting in a successful demonstration that quantum communication with satellites is feasible. His dream is to put sources of entangled light onto a satellite in orbit. A first step was achieved during an experiment at the Italian Matera Laser Ranging Observatory.

=== Further novel entangled states ===
With his group, Anton Zeilinger made many contributions to the realization of novel entangled states. The source for polarization-entangled photon pairs developed with Paul Kwiat when he was a PostDoc in Zeilinger's group is used in many laboratories. The first demonstration of entanglement of orbital angular momentum of photons opened up a new field of research in many laboratories.

=== Macroscopic quantum superposition ===
Zeilinger is also interested to extend quantum mechanics into the macroscopic domain. In the early 1990s, he started experiments in the field of atom optics. He developed a number of ways to coherently manipulate atomic beams, many of which, like the coherent energy shift of an atomic De Broglie wave upon diffraction at a time-modulated light wave, have become part of today's ultracold atom experiments. In 1999, Zeilinger abandoned atom optics for experiments with very complex and massive macro-molecules – fullerenes. The successful demonstration of quantum interference for these C_{60} and C_{70} molecules in 1999 opened up a very active field of research.

In 2005, Zeilinger with his group investigated the quantum physics of mechanical cantilevers. In the year 2006 along with Heidmann in Paris and Kippenberg in Garching they demonstrated experimentally the self-cooling of a micro-mirror by radiation pressure, that is, without feedback.

Using orbital angular momentum states, he was able to demonstrate entanglement of angular momentum up to 300 ħ.

=== Further fundamental tests ===
Zeilinger's program of fundamental tests of quantum mechanics is aimed at implementing experimental realizations of many non-classical features of quantum physics for individual systems. In 1998, he provided the final test of Bell's inequality closing the communication loophole by using superfast random number generators. His group also realized the first Bell inequality experiment implementing the freedom-of-choice condition and provided the first realization of a Bell test without the fair sampling assumption for photons.

Among the further fundamental tests he performed the most notable one is his test of a large class of nonlocal realistic theories proposed by Leggett. The group of theories excluded by that experiment can be classified as those which allow reasonable subdivision of ensembles into sub-ensembles. It goes significantly beyond Bell's theorem. While Bell showed that a theory which is both local and realistic is at variance with quantum mechanics, Leggett considered nonlocal realistic theories where the individual photons are assumed to carry polarization. The resulting Leggett inequality was shown to be violated in the experiments of the Zeilinger group.

In an analogous way, his group showed that even quantum systems where entanglement is not possible exhibit non-classical features which cannot be explained by underlying non-contextual probability distributions.

=== Neutron interferometry ===
Anton Zeilinger's earliest work is perhaps his least known. His work on neutron interferometry has provided a foundation for his later research.

As a member of the group of his thesis supervisor, Helmut Rauch, at the Technical University of Vienna, Zeilinger participated in a number of neutron interferometry experiments at the Institut Laue–Langevin (ILL) in Grenoble. His very first such experiment confirmed a fundamental prediction of quantum mechanics, the sign change of a spinor phase upon rotation. This was followed by the first experimental realization of coherent spin superposition of matter waves. He continued his work in neutron interferometry at MIT with C.G. Shull (Nobel Laureate), focusing specifically on dynamical diffraction effects of neutrons in perfect crystals which are due to multi-wave coherent superposition. After his return to Europe, he built up an interferometer for very cold neutrons which preceded later similar experiments with atoms. The fundamental experiments there included a most precise test of the linearity of quantum mechanics. Zeilinger built a double-slit diffraction experiment on the S18 instrument at the Institut Laue-Langevin which, later on, gained in accuracy and could act with only one neutron at a time in the apparatus.

== Honours and awards ==
=== International prizes and awards ===
- European Optics Prize, European Optical Society (1996)
- Order Pour le Mérite for Arts and Sciences (2000)
- Klopsteg Memorial Award, American Association of Physics Teachers (2004)
- Descartes Prize, European Union, as member of the IST-QuComm project collaboration (2004)
- King Faisal International Prize in physics, King Faisal Foundation (2005)
- Quantum Electronics Prize, European Physical Society (2007)
- Inaugural Isaac Newton Medal, Institute of Physics (2008)
- Grand Merit Cross with Star of the Order of Merit of the Federal Republic of Germany (2009)
- Wolf Prize in Physics, Wolf Foundation (2012, with Alain Aspect and John Clauser)
- Fellow of the American Association for the Advancement of Science (elected 2012)
- Silver medal of the Senate of the Czech Republic (2017)
- John Stewart Bell Prize for Research on Fundamental Issues in Quantum Mechanics and their Applications, University of Toronto (2017, with Ronald Hanson and Sae Woo Nam)
- Cozzarelli Prize in Physical and Mathematical Sciences, PNAS and National Academy of Sciences (2018, with Alexey A. Melnikov, Hendrik Poulsen Nautrup, Mario Krenn, Vedran Dunjko, Markus Tiersch and Hans Briegel)
- Micius Quantum Prize, Micius Quantum Foundation (2019, with Stephen Wiesner, Charles H. Bennett, Gilles Brassard, Artur Ekert and Pan Jianwei)
- Heisenberg Medal of the Heisenberg Society (2022)
- Nobel Prize in Physics (2022, with John Clauser, Alain Aspect)

=== Austrian prizes and awards ===
- Austrian Decoration for Science and Art, Republic of Austria (2001)
- Grand Decoration of Honour in Gold with Sash for Services to the Republic of Austria (2024)

== In popular culture ==
Zeilinger has been interviewed by Morgan Freeman in season 2 of Through the Wormhole.
