= Neutron interferometer =

Interferometer using neutron diffraction to make precise measurements

In physics, a neutron interferometer is an interferometer capable of diffracting neutrons, allowing the wave-like nature of neutrons, and other related phenomena, to be explored.

== Interferometry ==
Interferometry inherently depends on the wave nature of the object. As pointed out by de Broglie in his PhD thesis, particles, including neutrons, can behave like waves (the so-called wave–particle duality, now explained in the general framework of quantum mechanics). The wave functions of the individual interferometer paths are created and recombined coherently which needs the application of dynamical theory of diffraction. Neutron interferometers are the counterpart of X-ray interferometers and are used to study quantities or benefits related to thermal neutron radiation.

== Applications ==
In 1975 Werner and Overhauser demonstrated quantum phase shifts on neutron matter waves due to gravity. The interferometer was oriented such that two paths are at different heights in Earth's gravitational field. The interferometer was sufficiently sensitive to detect the phase shift due to different acceleration. The phase shift originates from time-dilation differences along the two paths.

== Construction ==
Like X-ray interferometers, neutron interferometers are typically made from a single large crystal of silicon, often 10 to 30 or more centimeters in diameter and 20 to 60 cm or more in length. Modern semiconductor technology allows large single-crystal silicon boules to be easily grown. Since the boule is a single crystal, the atoms in the boule are precisely aligned, to within small fractions of a nanometer or an angstrom, over the entire boule. The interferometer is created by removing all but three slices of silicon, held in perfect alignment by a base. (image) Neutrons impinge on the first slice, where, by diffraction from the crystalline lattice, they separate into two beams. At the second slice, they are diffracted again, with two beams continuing on to the third slice. At the third slice, the beams recombine, interfering constructively or destructively, completing the interferometer. Without the precise, angstrom-level alignment of the three slices, the interference results would not be meaningful.

== Cold neutrons ==
The first neutron interferometer experiments were performed in the 1980s. Experiments with cold neutrons are more recent. Only recently, a neutron interferometer for cold and ultracold neutrons was designed and successfully run. Neutron-optical components in this case comprise three gratings. They are artificially holographically produced, i.e., by means of a light-optic two-wave interference setup illuminating a photo-neutron-refractive polymer. Mechanical stability and count rates are crucial for such an experiment. Therefore, efficient, thermally and mechanically stable optical devices are needed.
