= Quantum Experiments at Space Scale =

Chinese quantum research satellite

- Names: Quantum Space Satellite; Micius / Mozi
- Mission type: Technology demonstrator
- Operator: Chinese Academy of Sciences
- COSPAR ID: 2016-051A
- SATCAT no.: 41731
- Mission duration: 2 years (planned); 9 years, 5 months, 9 days (final)

Spacecraft properties
- Manufacturer: Chinese Academy of Sciences
- BOL mass: 631 kg (1,391 lb)

Start of mission
- Launch date: 15 August 2016, 17:40 UTC
- Rocket: Long March 2D
- Launch site: Jiuquan LA-4
- Contractor: Shanghai Academy of Spaceflight Technology

End of mission
- Disposal: deorbited
- Decay date: 25 January 2026

Orbital parameters
- Regime: Sun-synchronous
- Perigee altitude: 488 km (303 mi)
- Apogee altitude: 584 km (363 mi)
- Inclination: 97.4 degrees

Transponders
- Band: Ultraviolet

Instruments
- Sagnac interferometer

Quantum Experiments at Space Scale (QUESS; Chinese: 量子科学实验卫星; pinyin: Liàngzǐ kēxué shíyàn wèixīng; lit. 'Quantum Science Experiment Satellite'), is a Chinese research project in the field of quantum physics. QUESS was launched on 15 August 2016.

The project consists of the satellite Micius, or Mozi (Chinese: 墨子), after the ancient Chinese philosopher, operated by the Chinese Academy of Sciences, as well as ground stations in China. The University of Vienna and the Austrian Academy of Sciences are running the satellite's European receiving stations. The satellite conducted Space-Earth quantum key distribution (Chinese: 量子密钥分发) experiments, facilitated by laser communications experiment carried on Tiangong-2 space laboratory module.

== Design and development ==
QUESS is a proof-of-concept mission designed to facilitate quantum optics experiments over long distances to allow the development of quantum encryption and quantum teleportation technology. The project originated in the 1990s as first a competition and later a collaboration between Anton Zeilinger and his Ph.D. student Jianwei Pan, to send quantum information across every larger distances. The Chinese government quickly funded Pan's project to build a satellite; unable to get funding for a European satellite, Zeilinger became a collaborator with Micius.

Quantum encryption uses the principle of entanglement to facilitate communication that can absolutely detect whether a third party has intercepted a message in transit thus denying undetected decryption. By producing pairs of entangled photons, QUESS will allow ground stations separated by many thousands of kilometres to establish secure quantum channels. QUESS itself has limited communication capabilities: it needs line-of-sight, and can only operate when not in sunlight.

Further Micius satellites were planned, including a global network by 2030. The mission cost was around US$100 million in total.

In March 2025, researchers reported the development of the world’s first quantum microsatellite, Jinan-1, and demonstrated real-time satellite-based quantum key distribution (QKD) with multiple compact ground stations in China and South Africa. During experiments, Jinan-1 established optical links with ground stations in cities including Jinan, Hefei, Wuhan, Shanghai, and Stellenbosch and generated secure keys in real time, enabling encrypted communication between Beijing and Stellenbosch over a distance of approximately 12,900 km. The experiment showed the feasibility of using lightweight microsatellites and portable ground stations for long-distance quantum communication, laying groundwork for potential constellations of quantum satellites and large-scale quantum networks.

== Mission ==
Ground stations

The initial experiment demonstrated quantum key distribution (QKD) between Xinjiang Astronomical Observatory near Ürümqi and Xinglong Observatory near Beijing – a great-circle distance of approximately 2,500 kilometres (1,600 mi). In addition, QUESS tested Bell's inequality at a distance of 1,200 km (750 mi) – further than any experiment to date – and teleported a photon state between Shiquanhe Observatory in Ali, Tibet Autonomous Region, and the satellite. This requires very accurate orbital maneuvering and satellite tracking so the base stations can keep line-of-sight with the craft. In 2021 full quantum state teleportation was demonstrated over 1,200 km (750 mi) at ground, based on entanglement distributed by the satellite.

Once experiments within China concluded, QUESS created an international QKD channel between China and the Institute for Quantum Optics and Quantum Information, Vienna, Austria − a ground distance of 7,500 km (4,700 mi), enabling the first intercontinental secure quantum video call in 2016.

=== Launch ===
The launch was initially scheduled for July 2016, but was rescheduled to August, with notification of the launch being sent just a few days in advance. The spacecraft was launched by a Long March 2D rocket from Jiuquan Launch Pad 603, Launch Area 4 on 17 August 2016, at 17:40 UTC (01:40 local time).

=== Multi-payload mission ===
The launch was a multi-payload mission shared with QUESS, LiXing-1 research satellite, and ³Cat-2 Spanish science satellite.

- LiXing-1: LiXing-1 is a Chinese satellite designed to measure upper atmospheric density by lowering its orbit to 100–150 km. Its mass is 110 kg. On 19 August 2016, the satellite reentered into the atmosphere, so the mission is closed.
- ³Cat-2: The 3Cat-2 (spelled "cube-cat-two") is the second satellite in the 3Cat series and the second satellite developed in Catalonia at Polytechnic University of Catalonia's NanoSat Lab. It is a 6-Unit CubeSat flying a novel GNSS Reflectometer (GNSS-R) payload for Earth observation. Its mass is 7.1 kg.

=== Deorbit ===
The spacecraft reentered the atmosphere on 25 January 2026, roughly 9.5 years after the launch.

== Secure key distribution ==
The main instrument on board QUESS is a "Sagnac effect" interferometer. This is a device that generates pairs of entangled photons, allowing one of each to be transmitted to the ground. This will allow QUESS to perform Quantum key distribution (QKD) – the transmission of a secure cryptographic key that can be used to encrypt and decrypt messages – to two ground stations. QKD theoretically offers truly secure communication. In QKD, two parties who want to communicate share a random secret key transmitted using pairs of entangled photons sent with random polarization, with each party receiving one-half of the pair. This secret key can then be used as a one-time pad, allowing the two parties to communicate securely through normal channels. Any attempt to eavesdrop on the key will disturb the entangled state in a detectable way. QKD has been attempted on Earth, both with direct line-of-sight between two observatories, and using fibre optic cables to transmit the photons. However, fiber optics and the atmosphere both cause scattering, which destroys the entangled state, and this limits the distance over which QKD can be carried out. Sending the keys from an orbiting satellite results in less scattering, which allows QKD to be performed over much greater distances.

In addition, QUESS could test some of the basic foundations of quantum mechanics. Bell's theorem says that no local hidden-variable theory can ever reproduce the predictions of quantum physics, and QUESS was able to test the principle of locality over 1,200 km (750 mi).

The quantum key distribution experiment won American Association for the Advancement of Science (AAAS)'s Newcomb Cleveland Prize in 2018 for its contribution to laying the foundation for ultra-secure communication networks of the future.

== Analysis ==
QUESS lead scientist Pan Jianwei told Reuters that the project has "enormous prospects" in the defence sphere. The satellite will provide secure communications between Beijing and Ürümqi, capital of Xinjiang, the remote western region of China. The US Department of Defense believes China is aiming to achieve the capability to counter the use of enemy space technology. Chinese Communist Party general secretary Xi Jinping has prioritised China's space program, which has included anti-satellite missile tests, and the New York Times noted that quantum technology was a focus of the thirteenth five-year plan, which the China government set out earlier that year. The Wall Street Journal said that the launch put China ahead of rivals, and brought them closer to "hack-proof communications". Several outlets identified Edward Snowden's leak of US surveillance documents as an impetus for the development of QUESS, with Popular Science calling it "a satellite for the post-Snowden age".

== Similar projects ==
QUESS is the first spacecraft launched capable of generating entangled photons in space, although transmission of single photons via satellites has previously been demonstrated by reflecting photons generated at ground-based stations off orbiting satellites. While not generating fully entangled photons, correlated pairs of photons have been produced in space using a cubesat by the National University of Singapore and the University of Strathclyde. A German consortium has performed quantum measurements of optical signals from the geostationary Alphasat Laser Communication Terminal. The US Defense Advanced Research Projects Agency (DARPA) launched the Quiness macroscopic quantum communications project to catalyze the development of an end-to-end global quantum internet in 2012.

In the late 2025 to early 2026, ESA intends to launch the Eagle-1 quantum key distribution satellite, with a goal similar to that of the Chinese QUESS. It will be part of the development and deployment of the European Quantum Communication Infrastructure (EuroQCI).

== See also ==
- Chinese space program
- Quantum information science
- Quantum information
  - Quantum cryptography
  - Quantum computing
  - Quantum key distribution
  - Quantum teleportation
