= Entanglement distillation =

Process of "purifying" entangled quantum states

Entanglement distillation (also called entanglement purification) is the transformation of N copies of an arbitrary entangled state $\rho$ into some number of approximately pure Bell pairs, using only local operations and classical communication. Entanglement distillation can overcome the degenerative influence of noisy quantum channels by transforming previously shared, less-entangled pairs into a smaller number of maximally-entangled pairs.

== History ==
The limits for entanglement dilution and distillation are due to C. H. Bennett, H. Bernstein, S. Popescu, and B. Schumacher, who presented the first distillation protocols for pure states in 1996; entanglement distillation protocols for mixed states were introduced by Bennett, Gilles Brassard, Popescu, Schumacher, John A. Smolin and William Wootters the same year. Bennett, David DiVincenzo, Smolin and Wootters established the connection to quantum error-correction in a ground-breaking paper published in August 1996, also in the journal of Physical Review, which has stimulated a lot of subsequent research.

== Motivation ==
Suppose that two parties, Alice and Bob, would like to communicate classical information over a noisy quantum channel. Either classical or quantum information can be transmitted over a quantum channel by encoding the information in a quantum state. With this knowledge, Alice encodes the classical information that she intends to send to Bob in a (quantum) product state, as a tensor product of reduced density matrices $p_{1} \otimes p_{2} \otimes \cdots$ where each $p$ is diagonal and can only be used as a one time input for a particular channel $\epsilon$.

The fidelity of the noisy quantum channel is a measure of how closely the output of a quantum channel resembles the input, and is therefore a measure of how well a quantum channel preserves information. If a pure state $\psi$ is sent into a quantum channel emerges as the state represented by density matrix $p$, the fidelity of transmission is defined as $F = \langle\psi|p|\psi\rangle$.

The problem that Alice and Bob now face is that quantum communication over large distances depends upon successful distribution of highly entangled quantum states, and due to unavoidable noise in quantum communication channels, the quality of entangled states generally decreases exponentially with channel length as a function of the fidelity of the channel. Entanglement distillation addresses this problem of maintaining a high degree of entanglement between distributed quantum states by transforming N copies of an arbitrary entangled state $\rho$ into approximately $S(\rho)N$ Bell pairs, using only local operations and classical communication. The objective is to share strongly correlated qubits between distant parties (Alice and Bob) in order to allow reliable quantum teleportation or quantum cryptography.

== Entanglement entropy ==
Entanglement entropy quantifies entanglement. Several different definitions have been proposed.

=== Von Neumann entropy ===
The von Neumann entropy is a measure of the "quantum uncertainty" or "quantum randomness" associated with a quantum state, analogous to the concept of Shannon entropy in classical information theory. Von Neumann entropy measures how "mixed" or "pure" a quantum state is. Pure states (e.g., states that are entirely definite like $|\psi\rangle \langle \psi|$) have a von Neumann entropy of 0. In pure states, there is no uncertainty about the system's state. Mixed states (e.g., probabilistic mixtures of pure states) have a positive entropy value, reflecting an inherent uncertainty in the system's state.

For a given quantum system, the von Neumann entropy $S$ is defined as:

$S(\rho)=-\textrm{Tr}(\rho\log\rho),$

where $\rho$ is the density matrix representing the state of the quantum system and $\textrm{Tr}$ denotes the trace operation, summing over the diagonal elements of a matrix.

For a maximally mixed state (where all states are equally probable), von Neumann entropy is maximal. Von Neumann entropy is invariant under unitary transformations, meaning that if $\rho$ is transformed by a unitary matrix $U$, $S(U \rho~U^{\dagger})=S(\rho)$. It is widely used in quantum information theory to study entanglement, quantum thermodynamics, and the coherence of quantum systems.

=== Rényi entanglement entropy ===
Rényi entropy is a generalization of the various concepts of entropy, depending on a parameter $\alpha$, which adjusts the sensitivity of the entropy measure to different probabilities.

For a quantum state represented by a density matrix $\rho$, the Rényi entropy of order $\alpha$ is defined as:

$S_{\alpha}(\rho)=\frac{1}{1-\alpha}\log(\textrm{Tr} (\rho^{\alpha}))$

where $\mathrm{Tr}(\rho^{\alpha})$ is the trace of $\rho$ raised to the power $\alpha$.

Rényi entropy $H_{\alpha}(P)$ is a non-increasing function of $\alpha$, meaning that higher values of $\alpha$ emphasize the more probable outcomes more heavily, leading to a lower entropy value. Different values of $\alpha$ allow Rényi entropy to highlight different aspects of the probability distribution (or quantum state), with higher $\alpha$ emphasizing high-probability events. Rényi entropy is often used in contexts such as fractal dimensions, signal processing, and statistical mechanics, where a flexible measure of uncertainty or diversity is useful.

As an example of Renyi entropy, a two qubit system can be written as a superposition of possible computational basis qubit states: $|00\rangle, |01\rangle, |10\rangle, |11\rangle$, each with an associated complex coefficient $\alpha\,\!$:
$$|\psi\rangle =  \alpha_{00}|00\rangle + \alpha_{01}|01\rangle + \alpha_{10}|10\rangle + \alpha_{11}|11\rangle$$

As in the case of a single qubit, the probability of measuring a particular computational basis state $|x\rangle$ is the square of the modulus of its amplitude, or associated coefficient, $|\alpha_{x}|^{2}\,\!$, subject to the normalization condition $\sum_{x \in {0,1}} |\alpha_{x}|^{2} = 1$. The normalization condition guarantees that the sum of the probabilities add up to 1, meaning that upon measurement, one of the states will be observed.

The Bell state is a particularly important example of a two qubit state: $\frac{1}{\sqrt{2}}(|00\rangle+|11\rangle)$

Bell states possess the property that measurement outcomes on the two qubits are correlated. As can be seen from the expression above, the two possible measurement outcomes are zero and one, both with probability of 50%. As a result, a measurement of the second qubit always gives the same result as the measurement of the first qubit.

Bell states can be used to quantify entanglement. Let m be the number of high-fidelity copies of a Bell state that can be produced using local operations and classical communication (LOCC). Given a large number of Bell states the amount of entanglement present in a pure state $|\psi\rangle$ can then be defined as the ratio of $n/m$, where $n$ is the number of states transform to Bell state, called the distillable entanglement of a particular state $|\phi\rangle$, which gives a quantified measure of the amount of entanglement present in a given system. The process of entanglement distillation aims to saturate this limiting ratio. The number of copies of a pure state that may be converted into a maximally entangled state is equal to the von Neumann entropy $S(p)$ of the state, which is an extension of the concept of classical entropy for quantum systems. Mathematically, for a given density matrix $p$, the von Neumann entropy $S(p)$ is $S(p) = -\mathrm{Tr}(p \ln p)$. Entanglement can then be quantified as the entropy of entanglement, which is the von Neumann entropy of either $p_{A}$ or $p_{B}$ as:
$$E = -\mathrm{Tr}(p_{A} \ln p_{A}) = -\mathrm{Tr}(p_{B} \ln p_{B}),$$

Which ranges from 0 for a product state to $\ln 2$ for a maximally entangled state (if the $\ln$ is replaced by $\log_2$ then maximally entangled has a value of 1).

== Entanglement concentration ==
=== Pure states ===
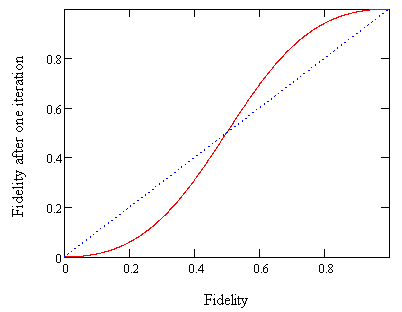
The new fidelity after one iteration of the distillation protocol for pure states

Given n particles in the singlet state shared between Alice and Bob, local actions and classical communication will suffice to prepare m arbitrarily good copies of $\phi$ with a yield

$\frac{m}{n} \to \frac{1}{E(\phi)}$ as $n \to \infty$.

Let an entangled state $|\psi\rangle$ have a Schmidt decomposition:
$$|\psi\rangle = \sum_{x}\sqrt{p(x)}|x_{A}\rangle|x_{B}\rangle$$
where coefficients p(x) form a probability distribution, and thus are positive valued and sum to unity. The tensor product of this state is then,
$$|\psi\rangle^{\otimes m} = \sum_{x_{1},x_{2},\dots,x_{m}}\sqrt{p(x_{1}) p(x_{2}) \dots p(x_{m})}|x_{1A} x_{2A} \dots x_{mA}\rangle | x_{1B} x_{2B} \dots x_{mB}\rangle$$

Now, omitting all terms $x_{1}, \dots, x_{m}$ which are not part of any sequence which is likely to occur with high probability, known as the typical set: $A_{\epsilon}^{(n)}$ the new state is
$$|\phi_{m}\rangle = \sum_{x \epsilon A_{\epsilon}^{(n)}} \sqrt{p(x_{1}) p(x_{2}) \dots p(x_{m})} |x_{1A} x_{2A} \dots x_{mA} \rangle | x_{1B} x_{2B} \dots x_{mB} \rangle$$

And renormalizing,
$$|\phi_{m}'\rangle = \frac{|\phi_{m}\rangle}{\sqrt{\langle\phi_{m}|\phi_{m}\rangle}}$$

Then the fidelity

$F(|\psi\rangle ^{\otimes m}, |\phi_{m}^{'}\rangle) \to 1$ as $m \to \infty$.

Suppose that Alice and Bob are in possession of $m$ copies of $|\psi\rangle$. Alice can perform a measurement onto the typical set $A_{\epsilon}^{(n)}$ subset of $p_{\psi}\,\!$, converting the state $|\psi\rangle^{\otimes m} \rightarrow |\phi_{m}\rangle$ with high fidelity. The theorem of typical sequences then shows us that $1 - \delta$ is the probability that the given sequence is part of the typical set, and may be made arbitrarily close to 1 for sufficiently large m, and therefore the Schmidt coefficients of the renormalized Bell state $|\phi_{m}'\rangle$ will be at most a factor ${1}/{\sqrt{1-\delta}}$ larger. Alice and Bob can now obtain a smaller set of n Bell states by performing LOCC on the state $|\phi_{m}'\rangle$ with which they can overcome the noise of a quantum channel to communicate successfully.

Universal entanglement concentration studies the case where the Schmidt coefficients of the input pure state are not assumed to be known. Matsumoto and Hayashi proposed a distortion-free universal protocol that achieves the entropy rate and produces an exact maximally entangled state when it succeeds.

=== Mixed states ===
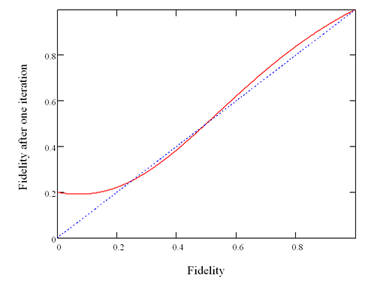
The new fidelity after one iteration of the distillation protocol presented here for mixed states

Many techniques have been developed for doing entanglement distillation for mixed states, giving a lower bounds on the value of the distillable entanglement $D(p)$ for specific classes of states $p$.

One common method involves Alice not using the noisy channel to transmit source states directly but instead preparing a large number of Bell states, sending half of each Bell pair to Bob. The result from transmission through the noisy channel is to create the mixed entangled state $p$, so that Alice and Bob end up sharing $m$ copies of $p$. Alice and Bob then perform entanglement distillation, producing $m \cdot D(p)$ almost perfectly entangled states from the mixed entangled states $p$ by performing local unitary operations and measurements on the shared entangled pairs, coordinating their actions through classical messages, and sacrificing some of the entangled pairs to increase the purity of the remaining ones. Alice can now prepare an $m \cdot D(p)$ qubit state and teleport it to Bob using the $m \cdot D(p)$ Bell pairs which they share with high fidelity. What Alice and Bob have then effectively accomplished is having simulated a noiseless quantum channel using a noisy one, with the aid of local actions and classical communication.

Let $M$ be a general mixed state of two spin-1/2 particles which could have resulted from the transmission of an initially pure singlet state
$$\psi^{-} = (\uparrow\downarrow-\downarrow\uparrow)/\sqrt{2}$$
through a noisy channel between Alice and Bob, which will be used to distill some pure entanglement. The fidelity of M
$$F = \langle\psi^{-}|M|\psi^{-}\rangle$$
is a convenient expression of its purity relative to a perfect singlet. Suppose that M is already a pure state of two particles $M = |\phi\rangle\langle\phi|$ for some $\phi$. The entanglement for $\phi$, as already established, is the von Neumann entropy $E(\phi) = S(p_{A}) = S(p_{B})$ where
$$p_{A} = \operatorname{tr}^{}_{B}(|\phi\rangle\langle\phi|),$$
and likewise for $p_{B}$, represent the reduced density matrices for either particle. The following protocol is then used:

1. Performing a random bilateral rotation on each shared pair, choosing a random SU(2) rotation independently for each pair and applying it locally to both members of the pair transforms the initial general two-spin mixed state M into a rotationally symmetric mixture of the singlet state $\psi^{-}$ and the three triplet states $\psi^{+}$ and $\phi^{\pm}$:
  $$W_{F} = F \cdot |\psi^{-}\rangle\langle\psi^{-}| + \frac{1-F}{3}|\phi^{+}\rangle\langle\phi^{+}| + \frac{1-F}{3}|\psi^{+}\rangle\langle\psi^{+}| + \frac{1-F}{3}|\phi^{-}\rangle\langle\phi^{-}|$$
  The Werner state $W_{F}$ has the same purity F as the initial mixed state M from which it was derived due to the singlet's invariance under bilateral rotations.
2. Each of the two pairs is then acted on by a unilateral rotation, which we can call $\sigma_{y}$, which has the effect of converting them from mainly $\psi^{-}$ Werner states to mainly $\phi^{+}$ states with a large component $F > \frac{1}{2}$ of $\phi^{+}$ while the components of the other three Bell states are equal.
3. The two impure $\phi^{+}$ states are then acted on by a bilateral XOR, and afterwards the target pair is locally measured along the z axis. The unmeasured source pair is kept if the target pair's spins come out parallel as in the case of both inputs being true $\phi^{+}$ states; and it is discarded otherwise.
4. If the source pair has not been discarded it is converted back to a predominantly $\psi^{-}$ state by a unilateral $\sigma_{y}$ rotation, and made rotationally symmetric by a random bilateral rotation.

Repeating the outlined protocol above will distill Werner states whose purity may be chosen to be arbitrarily high $F_\text{out} < 1$ from a collection M of input mixed states of purity $F_\text{in} > \frac{1}{2}$ but with a yield tending to zero in the limit $F_\text{out} \to 1$. By performing another bilateral XOR operation, this time on a variable number $k(F) \approx \frac{1}{\sqrt{1-F}}$ of source pairs, as opposed to 1, into each target pair prior to measuring it, the yield can be made to approach a positive limit as $F_\text{out} \to 1$. This method can then be combined with others to obtain an even higher yield.

== Distillation protocols ==
=== BBPSSW protocol ===
The Bennet-Brassard–Popescu–Schumacher–Smolin–Wooters (BBPSSW) protocol is one of the simplest protocols that uses CNOT (Controlled-NOT) gates and measurements to probabilistically increase the entanglement of Bell states (standard maximally entangled two-qubit states). Here's a step-by-step example:

Setup:

1. Suppose Alice and Bob share many copies of a noisy Bell state, represented by the density matrix: $\rho_{AB} = p \, |\Phi^{+}\rangle \langle \Phi^{+}| + \frac{1 - p}{3} \sum_{i \neq 0} |\Phi_{i} \rangle \langle \Phi_{i}|$ where $|\Phi^{+}\rangle = \frac{1}{\sqrt{2}} (|00\rangle + |11\rangle)$, and $|\Phi_{i}\rangle$ are the other Bell states: $|\Phi^{-}\rangle = \frac{1}{\sqrt{2}} (|00\rangle - |11\rangle)$, $|\Psi^{+}\rangle = \frac{1}{\sqrt{2}} (|01\rangle + |10\rangle)$, $|\Psi^{-}\rangle = \frac{1}{\sqrt{2}} (|01\rangle - |10\rangle)$.
2. The parameter $p$ represents the fidelity of $\rho_{AB}$ with respect to $|\Phi^{+}\rangle$, and the goal is to increase $p$ closer to 1 through distillation.

Protocol steps:

1. CNOT operation: Alice and Bob each take two qubits, say $\rho_{AB}^{(1)}$ and $\rho_{AB}^{(2)}$, and apply a CNOT gate between the pairs, with one qubit of each state as the control and the other as the target:$U_{\text{CNOT}} |x\rangle |y\rangle = |x\rangle |x \oplus y\rangle$, where $\oplus$ is addition modulo 2. This step correlates the two copies.
2. Measurement and postselection: Alice and Bob each measure the target qubits in the $Z$-basis (measuring 0 or 1). If both measure same output (i.e., 0 or 1), they keep the control qubits and discard the targets; otherwise, they discard both pairs. This postselection step has a probability of success but increases the fidelity of the remaining entangled pair.

Example calculation:

- After one round, if the initial fidelity $p$ of $|\Phi^{+}\rangle$ was 0.6, the protocol can increase it to around 0.8 with some probability.
- If multiple rounds are performed on the surviving pairs, $p$ can approach 1, producing a near-perfect $|\Phi^{+}\rangle$ state.

=== DEJMPS protocol ===
The Deutsch–Ekert–Jozsa–Macchiavello–Popescu–Sanpera (DEJMPS) protocol is an optimized version of BBPSSW and works especially well for Bell diagonal states.

Setup:
Assume the initial state is in the form: $\rho_{AB} = p_1 |\Phi^{+}\rangle \langle \Phi^{+}| + p_2 |\Psi^{+}\rangle \langle \Psi^{+}| + p_3 |\Phi^{-}\rangle \langle \Phi^{-}| + (1 - p_1 - p_2 - p_3) |\Psi^{-}\rangle \langle \Psi^{-}|$ where $p_1 + p_2 + p_3 + p_4 = 1$, and we assume $p_1$ is the largest coefficient.

Protocol steps:

1. Apply local unitaries: Alice and Bob apply unitary operations on their qubits to transform the state into a form where $p_1$ can be maximized. This involves bit and phase flips to swap the Bell states without affecting the target state, $|\Phi^{+}\rangle$.
2. CNOT operations: Similar to the BBPSSW protocol, Alice and Bob each apply a CNOT operation between their pairs.
3. Basis measurement: After the CNOT, Alice and Bob measure the target qubits in the Bell basis, postselecting on successful outcomes.

Example calculation:

- If the initial fidelity of $|\Phi^{+}\rangle$ is 0.6, a single round of DEJMPS can increase it more effectively than BBPSSW, pushing fidelity closer to 0.9, depending on the values of $p_2$, $p_3$, and $p_4$.

=== Filtering protocol ===
Filtering protocols apply local filtering operations to probabilistically enhance entanglement without requiring multiple pairs. This approach is useful when operations are limited, such as in photon-based quantum communication.

Protocol steps:

1. Consider a noisy entangled state: $\rho_{AB} = p |\Phi^{+}\rangle \langle \Phi^{+}| + (1 - p) |00\rangle \langle 00|$ where $p < 1$.
2. Local filtering operators: Alice and Bob apply filtering operators $F_A$ and $F_B$:
  $$F_A = \begin{pmatrix} p & 0 \\ 0 & 1 \end{pmatrix}, \quad F_B = \begin{pmatrix} p & 0 \\ 0 & 1 \end{pmatrix}$$.
3. Normalization and success probability: After applying the filters, the resulting state is re-normalized: $\rho_{AB'} = \frac{(F_A \otimes F_B) \rho_{AB} (F_A \otimes F_B)^{\dagger}}{\text{Tr}((F_A \otimes F_B) \rho_{AB} (F_A \otimes F_B)^{\dagger})}$.
  The probability of successful filtering (success probability) is: $P_{\text{success}} = \text{Tr}((F_A \otimes F_B) \rho_{AB} (F_A \otimes F_B)^{\dagger})$.
4. Resulting fidelity: If $p = 0.6$ initially, filtering can increase the fidelity to 0.8 or higher, but it reduces the probability of obtaining this result due to the probabilistic nature of the filter.

== Procrustean method ==
The Procrustean method of entanglement concentration can be used for as little as one partly entangled pair, being more efficient than the Schmidt projection method for entangling less than 5 pairs, and requires Alice and Bob to know the bias ($\theta$) of the n pairs in advance. The method derives its name from Procrustes because it produces a perfectly entangled state by chopping off the extra probability associated with the larger term in the partial entanglement of the pure states:
$$\cos\theta \left|\uparrow_{A}\right\rangle \otimes \left|\downarrow_{B}\right\rangle - \sin\theta \left|\downarrow_{A}\right\rangle \otimes \left|\uparrow_{B}\right\rangle$$

Assuming a collection of particles for which $\theta$ is known as being either less than or greater than $\pi / 4$ the Procrustean method may be carried out by keeping all particles which, when passed through a polarization-dependent absorber, or a polarization-dependent-reflector, which absorb or reflect a fraction $\tan^{2}\theta$ of the more likely outcome, are not absorbed or deflected. Therefore, if Alice possesses particles for which $\theta \neq \pi/4$, she can separate out particles which are more likely to be measured in the up/down basis, and left with particles in maximally mixed state of spin up and spin down. This treatment corresponds to a POVM (positive-operator-valued measurement). To obtain a perfectly entangled state of two particles, Alice informs Bob of the result of her generalized measurement while Bob doesn't measure his particle at all but instead discards his if Alice discards hers.

== Stabilizer protocol ==
The purpose of an $\left[ n,k\right]$ entanglement distillation protocol is to distill $k$ pure ebits from $n$ noisy ebits where $0\leq k\leq n$. The yield of such a protocol is $k/n$. Two parties can then use the noiseless ebits for quantum communication protocols.

The two parties establish a set of shared noisy ebits in the following way. The sender Alice first prepares $n$ Bell states $\left\vert \Phi^{+}\right\rangle ^{\otimes n}$ locally. She sends the second qubit of each pair over a noisy quantum channel to a receiver Bob. Let $\left\vert \Phi_{n}^{+}\right\rangle$ be the state $\left\vert \Phi^{+}\right\rangle^{\otimes n}$ rearranged so that all of Alice's qubits are on the left and all of Bob's qubits are on the right. The noisy quantum channel applies a Pauli error in the error set $\mathcal{E}\subset\Pi^{n}$ to the set of $n$ qubits sent over the channel. The sender and receiver then share a set of $n$ noisy ebits of the form $\left( \mathbf{I}\otimes\mathbf{A}\right) \left\vert \Phi_{n}^{+}\right\rangle$ where the identity $\mathbf{I}$ acts on Alice's qubits and $\mathbf{A}$ is some Pauli operator in $\mathcal{E}$ acting on Bob's qubits.

A one-way stabilizer entanglement distillation protocol uses a stabilizer code for the distillation procedure. Suppose the stabilizer $\mathcal{S}$ for an $\left[ n,k\right]$ quantum error-correcting code has generators $g_{1},\ldots,g_{n-k}$. The distillation procedure begins with Alice measuring the $n-k$ generators in $\mathcal{S}$. Let $\left\{ \mathbf{P}_{i}\right\}$ be the set of the $2^{n-k}$ projectors that project onto the $2^{n-k}$ orthogonal subspaces corresponding to the generators in $\mathcal{S}$. The measurement projects $\left\vert \Phi_{n}^{+}\right\rangle$ randomly onto one of the $i$ subspaces. Each $\mathbf{P}_{i}$ commutes with the noisy operator $\mathbf{A}$ on Bob's side so that
$$\left(  \mathbf{P}_{i}\otimes\mathbf{I}\right)  \left(  \mathbf{I}
\otimes\mathbf{A}\right)  \left\vert \Phi_{n}^{+}\right\rangle =\left(
\mathbf{I}\otimes\mathbf{A}\right)  \left(  \mathbf{P}_{i}\otimes
\mathbf{I}\right)  \left\vert \Phi_{n}^{+}\right\rangle .$$

The following important Bell-state matrix identity holds for an arbitrary matrix $\mathbf{M}$:
$$\left( \mathbf{M}\otimes\mathbf{I}\right)  \left\vert \Phi_{n}^{+}
\right\rangle =\left(  \mathbf{I}\otimes\mathbf{M}^{T}\right)  \left\vert
\Phi_{n}^{+}\right\rangle .$$

Then the above expression is equal to the following:
$$\left(  \mathbf{I}\otimes\mathbf{A}\right)  \left(  \mathbf{P}_{i}
\otimes\mathbf{I}\right)  \left\vert \Phi_{n}^{+}\right\rangle    =\left(
\mathbf{I}\otimes\mathbf{A}\right)  \left(  \mathbf{P}_{i}^{2}\otimes
\mathbf{I}\right)  \left\vert \Phi_{n}^{+}\right\rangle
=\left(  \mathbf{I}\otimes\mathbf{A}\right)  \left(  \mathbf{P}_{i}
\otimes\mathbf{P}_{i}^{T}\right)  \left\vert \Phi_{n}^{+}\right\rangle .$$
Therefore, each of Alice's projectors $\mathbf{P}_{i}$ projects Bob's qubits onto a subspace $\mathbf{P}_{i}^{T}$ corresponding to Alice's projected subspace $\mathbf{P}_{i}$. Alice restores her qubits to the simultaneous +1-eigenspace of the generators in $\mathcal{S}$. She sends her measurement results to Bob. Bob measures the generators in $\mathcal{S}$. Bob combines his measurements with Alice's to determine a syndrome for the error. He performs a recovery operation on his qubits to reverse the error. He restores his qubits $\mathcal{S}$. Alice and Bob both perform the decoding unitary corresponding to stabilizer $\mathcal{S}$ to convert their $k$ logical ebits to $k$ physical ebits.

== Entanglement-assisted stabilizer code ==
Luo and Devetak provided a straightforward extension of the above protocol (Luo and Devetak 2007). Their method converts an entanglement-assisted stabilizer code into an entanglement-assisted entanglement distillation protocol.

Luo and Devetak form an entanglement distillation protocol that has entanglement assistance from a few noiseless ebits. The crucial assumption for an entanglement-assisted entanglement distillation protocol is that Alice and Bob possess $c$ noiseless ebits in addition to their $n$ noisy ebits. The total state of the noisy and noiseless ebits is
$$\left(\mathbf{I}^{A}\otimes\left(  \mathbf{A\otimes I}\right)  ^{B}\right)\left\vert
\Phi_{n+c}^{+}\right\rangle$$
where $\mathbf{I}^{A}$ is the $2^{n+c}\times2^{n+c}$ identity matrix acting on Alice's qubits and the noisy Pauli operator $\left( \mathbf{A \otimes I}\right) ^{B}$ affects Bob's first $n$ qubits only. Thus the last $c$ ebits are noiseless, and Alice and Bob have to correct for errors on the first $n$ ebits only.

The protocol proceeds exactly as outlined in the previous section. The only difference is that Alice and Bob measure the generators in an entanglement-assisted stabilizer code. Each generator spans over $n+c$ qubits where the last $c$ qubits are noiseless.

We comment on the yield of this entanglement-assisted entanglement distillation protocol. An entanglement-assisted code has $n-k$ generators that each have $n+c$ Pauli entries. These parameters imply that the entanglement distillation protocol produces $k+c$ ebits. But the protocol consumes $c$ initial noiseless ebits as a catalyst for distillation. Therefore, the yield of this protocol is $k/n$.

== Entanglement dilution ==
The reverse process of entanglement distillation is entanglement dilution, where large copies of the Bell state are converted into less entangled states using LOCC with high fidelity. The aim of the entanglement dilution process, then, is to saturate the inverse ratio of n to m, defined as the distillable entanglement.

== Applications ==
Besides its important application in quantum communication, entanglement purification also plays a crucial role in error correction for quantum computation, because it can significantly increase the quality of logic operations between different qubits. The role of entanglement distillation is discussed briefly for the following applications.

=== Quantum error correction ===
Entanglement distillation protocols for mixed states can be used as a type of error-correction for quantum communications channels between two parties Alice and Bob, enabling Alice to reliably send mD(p) qubits of information to Bob, where D(p) is the distillable entanglement of p, the state that results when one half of a Bell pair is sent through the noisy channel $\epsilon$ connecting Alice and Bob.

In some cases, entanglement distillation may work when conventional quantum error-correction techniques fail. Entanglement distillation protocols are known which can produce a non-zero rate of transmission D(p) for channels which do not allow the transmission of quantum information due to the property that entanglement distillation protocols allow classical communication between parties as opposed to conventional error-correction which prohibits it.

=== Quantum cryptography ===
The concept of correlated measurement outcomes and entanglement is central to quantum key exchange, and therefore the ability to successfully perform entanglement distillation to obtain maximally entangled states is essential for quantum cryptography.

If an entangled pair of particles is shared between two parties, anyone intercepting either particle will alter the overall system, allowing their presence (and the amount of information they have gained) to be determined so long as the particles are in a maximally entangled state. Also, in order to share a secret key string, Alice and Bob must perform the techniques of privacy amplification and information reconciliation to distill a shared secret key string. Information reconciliation is error-correction over a public channel which reconciles errors between the correlated random classical bit strings shared by Alice and Bob while limiting the knowledge that a possible eavesdropper Eve can have about the shared keys. After information reconciliation is used to reconcile possible errors between the shared keys that Alice and Bob possess and limit the possible information Eve could have gained, the technique of privacy amplification is used to distill a smaller subset of bits maximizing Eve's uncertainty about the key.

=== Quantum teleportation ===
In quantum teleportation, a sender wishes to transmit an arbitrary quantum state of a particle to a possibly distant receiver. Quantum teleportation is able to achieve faithful transmission of quantum information by substituting classical communication and prior entanglement for a direct quantum channel. Using teleportation, an arbitrary unknown qubit can be faithfully transmitted via a pair of maximally-entangled qubits shared between sender and receiver, and a 2-bit classical message from the sender to the receiver. Quantum teleportation requires a noiseless quantum channel for sharing perfectly entangled particles, and therefore entanglement distillation satisfies this requirement by providing the noiseless quantum channel and maximally entangled qubits.

== See also ==
- Quantum channel
- Quantum cryptography
- Quantum entanglement
- Quantum state
- Quantum teleportation
- LOCC
- Purification theorem

== Notes and references ==
- Kwiat, Paul G.; Barraza-Lopez, Salvador; Stefanov, André; Gisin, Nicolas (2001), "Experimental entanglement distillation and 'hidden' non-locality", Nature, 409 (6823): 1014–1017, Bibcode:2001Natur.409.1014K, doi:10.1038/35059017, PMID 11234004, S2CID 4430054
- Yamamoto, Takashi; Koashi, Masato; Özdemir, Şahin Kaya; Imoto, Nobuyuki (2003), "Experimental extraction of an entangled photon pair from two identically decohered pairs", Nature, 421 (6921): 343–346, Bibcode:2003Natur.421..343Y, doi:10.1038/nature01358, PMID 12540894, S2CID 20824150.
- Pan, Jian-Wei; Gasparoni, Sara; Ursin, Rupert; Weihs, Gregor; Zeilinger, Anton (2003), "Experimental entanglement purification of arbitrary unknown states", Nature, 423 (6938): 417–422, Bibcode:2003Natur.423..417P, doi:10.1038/nature01623, PMID 12761543, S2CID 4393391.
- Pan, Jian-Wei; Simon, Christoph; Brunker, Časlav; Zeilinger, Anton (2001), "Entanglement purification for quantum communication", Nature, 410 (6832): 1067–1070, arXiv:quant-ph/0012026, Bibcode:2001Natur.410.1067P, doi:10.1038/35074041, PMID 11323664, S2CID 4424450.
- Nielsen, M.A.; Chuang, I.L. (2000), Quantum Computation and Quantum Information, Cambridge University Press, ISBN 0-521-63503-9
- Bouwmeester, Dirk; Ekert, Artur; Zeilinger, Anton (2000), The Physics of Quantum Information: Quantum Cryptography, Quantum Teleportation, Quantum Computation, Springer, ISBN 3-540-66778-4
- Newton, I. (1687), Principia Mathematica, vol. 1, Cambridge University Press
- Luo, Zhicheng; Devetak, Igor (2007), "Efficiently implementable codes for quantum key expansion", Physical Review A, 75 (1) 010303, arXiv:quant-ph/0608029, Bibcode:2007PhRvA..75a0303L, doi:10.1103/PhysRevA.75.010303, S2CID 119491901
- Mark M. Wilde, "From Classical to Quantum Shannon Theory", arXiv:1106.1445.
