= Bennett's laws =

Laws of quantum information

Bennett's laws of quantum information are:

1. 1 qubit $\geqslant$ 1 bit (classical),
2. 1 qubit $\geqslant$ 1 ebit (entanglement bit),
3. 1 ebit + 1 qubit $\geqslant$ 2 bits (i.e. superdense coding),
4. 1 ebit + 2 bits $\geqslant$ 1 qubit (i.e. quantum teleportation),

where $\geqslant$ indicates "can do the job of".

These principles were formulated around 1993 by Charles H. Bennett.
