= Overlapping distribution method =

The Overlapping distribution method was introduced by Charles H. Bennett for estimating chemical potential.

== Theory ==
For two N particle systems 0 and 1 with partition function $Q_{0}$ and $Q_{1}$ ,

from $F(N,V,T) = - k_{B}T \ln Q$

get the thermodynamic free energy difference is $\Delta F = -k_{B}T \ln (Q_{1}/Q_{0}) = - k_{B} T \ln (\frac{\int ds^{N}\exp[-\beta U_{1}(s^{N})]}{\int ds^{N}\exp[-\beta U_{0}(s^{N})]})$

For every configuration visited during this sampling of system 1 we can compute the potential energy U as a function of the configuration space, and the potential energy difference is

$\Delta U = U_{1}(s^{N}) - U_{0}(s^{N})$

Now construct a probability density of the potential energy from the above equation:

$p_{1}(\Delta U) = \frac{\int ds^{N}\exp(-\beta U_{1})\delta(U_{1}-U_{0}-\Delta U)}{Q_{1}}$

where in $p_{1}$ is a configurational part of a partition function

$p_{1}(\Delta U) = \frac{\int ds^{N}\exp(-\beta U_{1})\delta(U_{1}-U_{0}-\Delta U)}{Q_{1}} = \frac{\int ds^{N}\exp[-\beta(U_{0}+\Delta U)]\delta(U_{1}-U_{0}-\Delta U)}{Q_{1}}$ $= \frac{Q_{0}}{Q_{1}} \exp (-\beta \Delta U) \frac{\int ds^{N}\exp(-\beta U_{0})\delta(U_{1}-U_{0}-\Delta U)}{Q_{0}} = \frac{Q_{0}}{Q_{1}} \exp (- \beta \Delta U) p_{0}(\Delta U)$

since

$\Delta F = -k_{B}T \ln (Q_{1}/Q_{0})$

$\ln p_{1}(\Delta U) = \beta(\Delta F -\Delta U) + \ln p_{0}(\Delta U)$

now define two functions:

$f_{0}(\Delta U) = \ln p_{0}(\Delta U) - \frac{\beta\Delta U}{2} f_{1}(\Delta U) = \ln p_{1}(\Delta U) + \frac{\beta\Delta U}{2}$

thus that

$f_{1}(\Delta U) = f_{0}(\Delta U) + \beta\Delta F$

and$\Delta F$ can be obtained by fitting $f_{1}$ and $f_{0}$
