= John A. Smolin =

American physicist (born 1967)

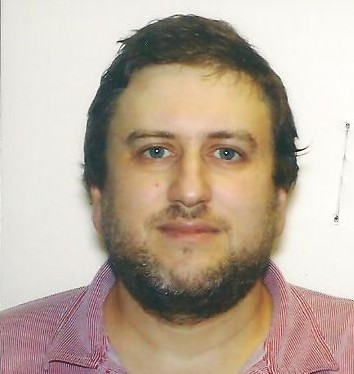
- Born: 1967 (age 58–59); New York City
- Education: Massachusetts Institute of Technology (S.B., Physics, 1989); University of California, Los Angeles (Ph.D., Physics, 1996)
- Known for: Quantum cryptography, The Smolin Spiral
- Scientific career
- Fields: Quantum information theory
- Workplaces: Thomas J. Watson Research Center

John A. Smolin (born 1967) is an American physicist and Fellow of the American Physical Society at IBM's Thomas J. Watson Research Center.

Smolin is best known for his work in quantum information theory, where, with collaborators, he introduced several important techniques, including entanglement distillation, for quantum error-correction and the faithful transmission of quantum information through noisy quantum channels, as well as for entanglement-assisted transmission of classical information. He helped elucidate the complex relations between classical and quantum capacities of various channels as well as phenomena such as data hiding and data unlocking that have no analog in classical information theory.

Together with Charles H. Bennett he built the world's first working demonstration of quantum cryptography in 1989, driven by software written by Francois Bessette, Gilles Brassard and Louis Salvail and implementing the BB84 quantum key distribution protocol.

Smolin coined the term "Church of the Larger Hilbert Space" to describe the habit of regarding every mixed state of a quantum system as a pure entangled state of a larger system, and every irreversible evolution as a reversible (unitary) evolution of a larger system.
