= Bell diagonal state =

Quantum states of two qubits

Bell diagonal states are a class of bipartite qubit states that are frequently used in quantum information and quantum computation theory.

== Definition ==
The Bell diagonal state is defined as the probabilistic mixture of Bell states:

$$|\phi^+\rangle = \frac{1}{\sqrt{2}} (|0\rangle_A \otimes |0\rangle_B + |1\rangle_A \otimes |1\rangle_B)$$
$$|\phi^-\rangle = \frac{1}{\sqrt{2}} (|0\rangle_A \otimes |0\rangle_B - |1\rangle_A \otimes |1\rangle_B)$$
$$|\psi^+\rangle = \frac{1}{\sqrt{2}} (|0\rangle_A \otimes |1\rangle_B + |1\rangle_A \otimes |0\rangle_B)$$
$$|\psi^-\rangle = \frac{1}{\sqrt{2}} (|0\rangle_A \otimes |1\rangle_B - |1\rangle_A \otimes |0\rangle_B)$$

In density operator form, a Bell diagonal state is defined as

$\varrho^{Bell}=p_1|\phi^+\rangle \langle \phi^+|+p_2|\phi^-\rangle\langle \phi^-|+p_3|\psi^+\rangle\langle \psi^+|+p_4|\psi^-\rangle\langle\psi^-|$

where $p_1,p_2,p_3,p_4$ is a probability distribution. Since $p_1+p_2+p_3+p_4=1$, a Bell diagonal state is determined by three real parameters. The maximum probability of a Bell diagonal state is defined as $p_{max}=\max\{p_1,p_2,p_3,p_4\}$.

== Properties ==
1. A Bell-diagonal state is separable if all the probabilities are less or equal to 1/2, i.e., $p_\text{max}\leq 1/2$.

2. Many entanglement measures have a simple formulas for entangled Bell-diagonal states:

Relative entropy of entanglement: $S_r=1-h(p_\text{max})$, where $h$ is the binary entropy function.

Entanglement of formation: $E_f=h(\frac{1}{2}+\sqrt{p_\text{max}(1-p_\text{max})})$,where $h$ is the binary entropy function.

Negativity: $N=p_\text{max}-1/2$

Log-negativity: $E_N=\log(2 p_\text{max} )$

3. Any 2-qubit state where the reduced density matrices are maximally mixed, $\rho_A=\rho_B=I/2$, is Bell-diagonal in some local basis. Viz., there exist local unitaries $U=U_1\otimes U_2$ such that $U\rho U^{\dagger}$ is Bell-diagonal.
