= Deferred measurement principle =

Two equivalent quantum logic circuits. One where measurement happens first, and one where an operation conditioned on the to-be-measured qubit happens first.

Measurement is performed early and the resulting classical bits are sent. The classical bits control if the 1-qubit X and Z gates are executed, allowing teleportation.

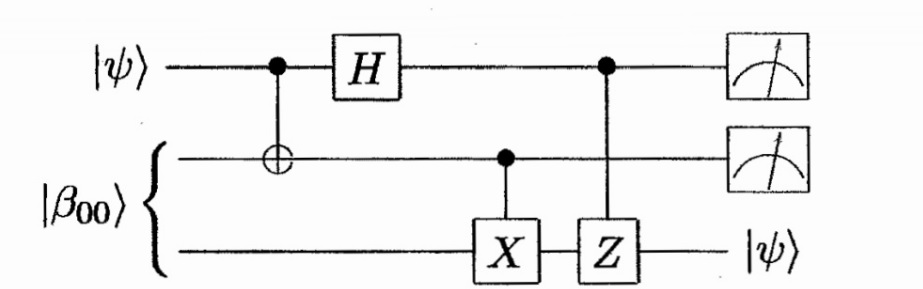
By moving the measurement to the end, the 2-qubit controlled-X and -Z gates need to be applied, which requires both qubits to be near (i.e. at a distance where 2-qubit quantum effects can be controlled), and thus limits the distance of the teleportation. While logically equivalent, deferring the measurement have physical implications.

Example: Two variants of the teleportation circuit. The 2-qubit states $|\Phi^{+}\rangle$ and $|\beta_{00}\rangle$ refer to the same Bell state.

The deferred measurement principle is a result in quantum computing which states that delaying measurements until the end of a quantum computation doesn't affect the probability distribution of outcomes.

A consequence of the deferred measurement principle is that measuring commutes with conditioning. The choice of whether to measure a qubit before, after, or during an operation conditioned on that qubit will have no observable effect on a circuit's final expected results.

Thanks to the deferred measurement principle, measurements in a quantum circuit can often be shifted around so they happen at better times. For example, measuring qubits as early as possible can reduce the maximum number of simultaneously stored qubits; potentially enabling an algorithm to be run on a smaller quantum computer or to be simulated more efficiently. Alternatively, deferring all measurements until the end of circuits allows them to be analyzed using only pure states (as otherwise density matrices would be needed).

== See also ==
- Holevo's theorem
- One-way quantum computer
- Quantum gate teleportation
