= Absolutely maximally entangled state =

Quantum Information Science

The absolutely maximally entangled (AME) state is a concept in quantum information science, which has many applications in quantum error-correcting code, discrete AdS/CFT correspondence, AdS/CMT correspondence, and more. It is the multipartite generalization of the bipartite maximally entangled state.

== Definition ==
The bipartite maximally entangled state $|\psi\rangle_{AB}$ is the one for which the reduced density operators are maximally mixed, i.e., $\rho_A=\rho_B=I/d$. Typical examples are Bell states.

A multipartite state $|\psi\rangle$ of a system $S$ is called absolutely maximally entangled if for any bipartition $A|B$ of $S$, the reduced density operator is maximally mixed $\rho_A=\rho_B=I/d$, where $d=\min\{d_A,d_B\}$.

== Property ==
The AME state does not always exist; in some given local dimension and number of parties, there is no AME state. There is a list of AME states in low dimensions created by Huber and Wyderka.

The existence of the AME state can be transformed into the existence of the solution for a specific quantum marginal problem.

The AME can also be used to build a kind of quantum error-correcting code called holographic error-correcting code.
